More than 1,500 African American officeholders served during the Reconstruction era (1865–1877) and in the years after Reconstruction before white supremacy, disenfranchisement, and the Democratic Party fully reasserted control in Southern states. Historian Canter Brown Jr. noted that in some states, such as Florida, the highest number of African Americans were elected or appointed to offices after the end of Reconstruction in 1877. The following is a partial list of notable African American officeholders from the end of the Civil War until before 1900. Dates listed are the year that a term states or the range of years served if multiple terms.

U.S. Senate 

 Blanche Bruce – Mississippi 1875–1881
P. B. S. Pinchback – Louisiana 1873, elected but the Senate refused to seat him (also Louisiana Lt. Governor, Louisiana Senate, acting Louisiana Governor, Louisiana Constitutional Convention)
Hiram Rhodes Revels – Mississippi 1870 (also Mississippi Secretary of State)

U.S. House of Representatives

 Richard H. Cain – South Carolina 1873–1975, 1877–1879 (also South Carolina Senate, House, Constitutional Congress)
 Henry P. Cheatham – North Carolina 1889–1894
 Robert C. De Large – South Carolina 1871–1873 (also South Carolina House, South Carolina Constitutional Convention, and  State Land Commissioner)
 Robert B. Elliott – South Carolina 1871–1874 (also South Carolina House, South Carolina  Attorney General, South Carolina Constitutional Convention, South Carolina Senate, city council)
 Jeremiah Haralson – Alabama 1875–1877 (also Alabama Senate and Alabama House)
 John Adams Hyman – North Carolina 1875–1877 (also North Carolina Senate and North Carolina Constitutional Convention)
 John Mercer Langston – Virginia 1890–1891 (also U.S. Minister to Haiti)
 Jefferson F. Long – Georgia 1871
 John R. Lynch – Mississippi 1873–1877, 1882–1883 (also speaker of the Mississippi House)
 John Willis Menard – Louisiana, 1868 elected but not seated
 Thomas E. Miller – South Carolina September 24, 1890 – March 3, 1891 (also South Carolina Senate, South Carolina House, and South Carolina Constitutional Convention)
 George W. Murray – South Carolina 1893–1897
 Charles E. Nash  – Louisiana 1875 –1877
 James E. O'Hara – North Carolina 1883–1887 (also North Carolina House)
 Joseph H. Rainey – South Carolina 1870–1879 (also South Carolina Senate and South Carolina Constitutional Convention)
 Alonzo J. Ransier – South Carolina 1873–1875 (also South Carolina Lt. Governor and Constitutional Convention)
 James T. Rapier – Alabama 1873–1875 (also Alabama Constitutional Convention)
 Robert Smalls – South Carolina 1875–1879, 1882–1887 (also South Carolina Senate, South Carolina House, and Constitutional Convention)
 Benjamin Sterling Turner – Alabama 1871–1873
 Josiah T. Walls – Florida 1871–1876 (also Florida House, Florida Senate, and Florida Constitutional Convention)
 George Henry White – North Carolina 1897–1901 (also North Carolina House and North Carolina Senate)

Alabama
Between 1868 and 1878, more than 100 African Americans served in the Alabama Legislature.

Alabama Senate
Alexander H. Curtis – Perry County 1872–1876 (also Alabama House and Alabama Constitutional Convention)
D. J. Daniels – Russell County 1872
James K. Greene – Hale County 1874–1876 (also Alabama House)
Jeremiah Haralson – Dallas County 1872–1876 (also Alabama House and U.S. Congress)
John W. Jones – Lowndes County 1872–1876
Lloyd Leftwich – Greene County 1872–1876
Benjamin F. Royal – Bullock County 1868–1876

Alabama House of Representatives 
Benjamin F. Alexander – Greene County 1868 (also Alabama Constitutional Convention)
G. W. Allen – Bullock County 1874
James H. Alston – Macon County 1868–1879
Matt Avery – Perry County 1867
Elijah Baldwin – Wilcox County 1874–1878
Granville G. Bennett – Sumter County 1874
Samuel Blandon  – Lee County 1868
William H. Blevins – Dallas County 1874–1878
James Bliss – Sumter County 1874
Matthew Boyd – Perry County 1874
George W. Braxdell – Talladega County 1870
Nathan A. Brewington – Lowndes County 1868
Richard Burke – Sumter County 1868
John Carraway – Mobile County 1868 (Speaker of the House)
Hugh A. Carson – Lowndes County 1876–1880 (also Alabama Constitutional Convention)
William E. Carson – Lowndes County 1872
Hershel V. Cashin – Montgomery County 1874–1878
Thomas Clark – Barbour County 1870
Thomas J. Clarke – Barbour County 1872
Henry A. Cochran – Dallas County 1870, 1872
Elijah Cook – Montgomery County 1874
George Cox – Montgomery County 1868
Henry H. Craig – Montgomery County 1870
 Alexander H. Curtis – Perry County 1870 (also Alabama Senate and Alabama Constitutional Convention)
 D. J. Daniels – Russell County 1874
 Thomas Diggs – Barbour County 1868–1872 (also Alabama Constitutional Convention)
 Mentor Dotson – Sumter County 1872
John Dozier – Perry County 1870–1874
Joseph Drawn – Dallas County 1868
Hales Ellsworth – Montgomery County 1872
George English – Wilcox County 1878
Charles Fagan – Montgomery County 1874
Samuel Fantroy – Barbour County 1872
Adam Gachet – Barbour County 1874
Prince Gardner – Russell County 1874
William Gaskin – Lowndes County 1870–1876
Edward Gee – Dallas County 1870
Captain Gilmer – Montgomery County 1876
Joseph H. Goldsby – Dallas County 1872
James K. Greene – Hale County 1868–1874 (also Alabama Senate)
Ovide Gregory – Mobile County 1868 (also Alabama Constitutional Convention)
Jeremiah Haralson – Dallas County 1870 (also Alabama Senate and U.S. Congress)
Charles E. Harris – Dallas County 1874
Charles O. Harris – Montgomery County 1876
D. H. Hill – Bullock County 1868
George Houston – Sumter County 1868
Benjamin Inge – Sumter County 1868
A. W. Johnson – Macon County 1874
R. L. Johnson – Dallas County 1870–1874
Green T. Johnston – Dallas County 1876
Columbus Jones – Madison County 1868 (also Alabama Constitutional Convention)
Reuben Jones – Madison County 1872
Shandy W. Jones – Tuscaloosa County 1868
Horace King – Russell County 1868–1872
David Law – Barbour County 1868
Samuel Lee – Lowndes County 1874
Thomas Lee – Perry County 1868
Greene S. W. Lewis – Perry County 1868, 1872–1878 (also Alabama Constitutional Convention)
Edwin C. Locke – Wilcox County 1874
Jacob Martin – Dallas County 1874
Perry Matthews – Bullock County 1872–1876
January Maull – Lowndes County 1872
Jefferson McCalley – Madison County 1868
Willis Merriweather – Wilcox County 1872–1876
G. R. Miller – Russell County 1872
Edward Odum – Barbour County 1874
George Patterson – Macon County 1872–1876
Samuel J. Patterson – Autauga County 1872
Robert Reed – Sumter County 1872–1876
Bristo W. Reese – Hale County 1872–1876
H. W. W. Rice – Talladega County 1868
A. G. Richardson – Wilcox County 1868
Henry St. Clair – Macon County 1870–1874
James Shaw – Mobile County 1868
Charles Smith – Bullock County 1874
Nimrod Snoddy – Greene County 1876
Lawrence S. Speed – Bullock County 1868–1874
Lawson Steele – Montgomery County 1872
William J. Stevens – Dallas County 1876
W. L. Taylor – Chambers County 1868
William Taylor – Sumter County 1872
Holland Thompson – Montgomery County 1868–1972
Frank H. Threatt – Marengo County
J. R. Treadwell – Russell County 1872
William V. Turner – Elmore County 1868
Mansfield Tyler – Lowndes County 1870
Thomas H. Walker – Dallas County 1872
Spencer Weaver – Dallas County 1868
Levi Wells – Marengo County 1870
A. E. Williams – Barbour County 1872–1876
L. J. Williams – Montgomery County 1868–1874
J. R. Witherspoon – Perry County 1874
Manly Wynne – Hale County 1874
Henry Young – Lowndes County 1868

Alabama Constitutional Convention

 Benjamin F. Alexander – Greene County 1867 (also Alabama House)
 Moses B. Avery – Montgomery County 1867
 Samuel Blanden – Lee County 1867
 John Carroway – Mobile County 1867
 Hugh A. Carson – Lowndes County 1875 (also Alabama House)
 Alexander H. Curtis – Perry County 1875 (also Alabama House and Alabama Senate)
 Thomas Diggs – Barbour County 1867 (also Alabama House)
 Peyton Finley – Montgomery County 1867
 J. K. Greene – Hale County 1867
 Ovid Gregory – Mobile County 1867 (also Alabama House)
 Jack Hatcher – Dallas County 1867
 Benjamin Inge – Sumter County 1867
 Washington Johnson – Russell County 1867
 Columbus Jones – Madison County 1867 (also Alabama House)
 L. S. Latham – Bullock County 1867
 Thomas Lee – Perry County 1867
 Greene S. W. Lewis – Perry County 1875 (also Alabama House)
 B. F. Royal – Bullock County 1867
 Henry Stokes – Dallas County 1867

Other state offices 
 William Hooper Councill – assistant engrossing clerk in the Alabama Legislature 1872, 1874
 Phillip Joseph – engrossing clerk in the Alabama Legislature 1872

Federal offices 

 Granville Bennett – postmaster of Catherine September 1, 1890 – January 15, 1891
 John P. Billingsley – postmaster of Marion March 25, 1874 – July 18, 1882
 Charles W. Childs – postmaster of Marion February 12, 1890 – October 28, 1893
 James F. Childs – postmaster of Marion July 18, 1882 – December 5, 1885
 Anthony R. Davison – postmaster of Lovan August 1, 1889 – October 28, 1891; March 28, 1890 – April 17, 1893
 John W. Davison – postmaster of Lovan March 25, 1890 – October 28, 1891
 Howell L. Goins – postmaster of Northport November 25, 1889 – March 17, 1890
 Rufus L. Gomez – postmaster of Luverne March 28, 1889 – October 5, 1889
 Jordan Hatcher – postmaster of Cahaba September 7, 1869 – September 26, 1882
 John W. Jones – postmaster of Hayneville June 6, 1882 – October 17, 1887

Local offices 

 S. L. David – mayor of Hobson City 1899

Arkansas
Between 1868 and 1893, 85 men noted as "colored" or "mulatto" were elected to the Arkansas legislature. Initially, they served under the 1868 Arkansas Constitution that granted them the right to vote and hold office. The Democrats retook control of state government and instituted the 1874 Constitution. As a result, after 1893, the next African American to serve as an Arkansas state legislator was in 1973.

Arkansas Senate
 George W. Bell – Desha and Chicot counties 1891, 1893
 Richard A. Dawson – Jefferson County 1873, 1874 (also Arkansas House)
 William Henry Grey – Phillips County 1875 (also Arkansas House, Arkansas Constitutional Convention, and Arkansas Commissioner of Immigration and State Lands)
 Samuel H. Holland – Ashley, Chicot, Drew, and Desha counties 1873, 1874
 W. H. Logan – Chicot and Desha counites 1887, 1889
 James W. Mason – Ashley, Chicot, Drew, Desha and counties 1868, 1871 (also Arkansas Constitutional Convention, postmaster, and judge)
 Anthony Stanford – Lee and Phillips counties 1877, 1879
 James T. White – Phillips and Monroe counties 1871 (also Arkansas House Arkansas Constitutional Convention)
 Ruben B. White – Pulaski and White counties 1873, 1874 
 John Willis Williams – Phillips County 1874

Arkansas House of Representatives
 Benjamin Frank Adair – Pulaski County 1891
 James M. Alexander – Phillips County 1871 (also justice of the peace)
 Isaac George Bailey – Desha County 1885
 Conway Barbour – Lafayette County 1871
 Austin Barrow – Phillips County 1871
 Peter H. Booth – Jefferson County 1893
 Levi B. Boston – Jefferson County 1874
 Joseph H. Bradford – Mississippi County 1885
 Joseph B. Brooks – Lafayette County 1885
 Cornelius "Neal" Brown – Pulaski County 1873
 Crockett Brown – Lee County 1877
 Hal B. Burton – Jefferson County 1887
 John H. Carr – Phillips County 1889–1894
 Barry Coleman – Phillips County 1874 and 1877
 William L. Copeland – Crittenden County 1873–1875
 Lawrence Crute – Chicot County 1873
 Richard A. Dawson – Jefferson County 1879 (also Arkansas Senate)
 Sebron Williams Dawson – Jefferson County 1889–1892
 Jacob N. Donohoo – Phillips County 1877, 1887–1892
 Anderson Ebberson – Jefferson County 1877, 1881
 Nathan E. Edwards – Chicot County 1893
 Edward Allen Fulton – Drew County 1871 (also postmaster)
 William Hines Furbush – Phillips County 1873, Lee County 1879
 Isaac Gillam – Pulaski County 1879
 Ed Glover – Jefferson County 1885
 William E. Gray – Pulaski County 1881
 William Henry Grey – Phillips County 1868 (also Arkansas Senate, Arkansas Constitutional Convention, and Arkansas Commissioner of Immigration and State Lands)
 Toney Grissom – Phillips County 1873–1875
 Jeff Haskins – St. Francis County 1871
 Ferdinand "Ferd" Havis – Jefferson County 1873
 Monroe E. Hawkins – Lafayette County 1868, 1873, 1874 (also Arkansas Constitutional Convention)
 Ned Hill – Jefferson County 1874
 Daniel Hunt – Hempstead County 1868
 William B. Jacko – Jefferson County 1885, 1887
 Ed Jefferson – Jefferson County 1887, 1889
 Adam R. Johnson – Crittenden County 1871
 Henry Augustus Johnson – Chicot County 1891
 John H. Johnson – Woodruff County 1873
 Green Hill Jones – Chicot County 1885, 1889
 Thomas R. Kersh – Lincoln County 1885, 1887
 Daniel W. Lewis – Crittenden County 1883
 George W. Lowe – Monroe County 1889–1892
 John G. Lucas – Jefferson County 1891
 William A. Marshall – Hempstead County 1873
 L. J. Maxwell – Jefferson County 1874–1875
 Americus Mayo – Monroe County 1871
 Charles Howard McKay – Jefferson County 1893
 Abraham H. Miller – Phillips County 1874
 William Murphy – Jefferson County 1873, 1877 (also Arkansas Constitutional Convention)
 Marshall M. Murray – Lafayette County 1883
 Hugh C. Newsome – Chicot County 1887
 Sandy Shepard Odum – Crittenden County 1887
 William C. Payne – Jefferson County 1879, 1881
 Burns Polk – Lee County 1873
 Carl R. Polk – Jefferson County 1871, 1881 (also a justice of the peace)
 Patrick T. Price – Lee County 1877
 James A. Robinson – Ashley, Chicot, Drew, Desha counties 1871, 1874
 Henry H. Robinson – Phillips County 1873
 John C. Rollins – Ashley, Chicot, Drew, Desha counties 1873
 Anderson Louis Rush – Pulaski County 1868–1869
 Granville Ryles – Pulaski County 1883
 Richard R. Samuels – Hempstead County 1868, 1869 (also Arkansas Constitutional Convention)
 Francis H. Sawyer – Lincoln County 1877
 Samuel H. Scott – Jefferson County 1885
 Archie Shepperson – Hempstead County 1873
 Rusty Sherrill – Jefferson County 1883
 George H. W. Stewart – Phillips County 1873
 Green W. Thompson – Pulaski County 1889
 George E. Trower – Conway County 1887
 G. W. Watson – Crittenden County 1891
 Blackstone Waterhouse – Jefferson County, Arkansas 1883
 John W. Webb – Ashley, Chicot, Drew, Desha counties 1871
 Reuben C. Weddington – Chicot County 1891
 Francis "Frank" W. White – Pulaski County 1883
 James T. White – Phillips and Monroe counties 1868–1870 (also Arkansas Senate and Arkansas Constitutional Convention)
 Henry W./N. Williams – Lincoln County 1889, 1891
 John Willis Williams – Phillips County 1873 (also Arkansas Senate)
 James Wofford – Crittenden County 1877
 S. L. Woolfolk – Jefferson County 1891
 William H. Young – Jefferson County 1871, 1883

Arkansas Constitutional Convention

 William Henry Grey – Phillips County 1868 (also Arkansas Senate, Arkansas House, and Arkansas Commissioner of Immigration and State Lands)
 Monroe E. Hawkins – Lafayette County 1868 (also Arkansas House)
 Thomas P. Johnson – Little Rock 1868
 James W. Mason – Chicot County 1868 (also Arkansas Senate,  postmaster, and judge)
 William Murphy – Jefferson County 1868 (also Arkansas House)
 W. Henry Rector – Little Rock 1868
 Richard R. Samuels – Washington County 1868 (also Arkansas House)
 James T. White – Phillips County 1868 and 1874 (also Arkansas House, Arkansas Senate, and Arkansas Commissioner of Public Works)

Other state offices 
 Joseph Carter Corbin – Arkansas Superintendent of public schools 1873–1875
 William Henry Grey – Arkansas Commissioner of Immigration and State Lands (also Arkansas House, Arkansas Senate, and Arkansas Constitutional Convention)
 James T. White – Arkansas Commissioner of Public Works (also Arkansas House, Arkansas Senate, and Arkansas Constitutional Convention)

Federal offices 

 Elisha Davis – postmaster of Sweet Home November 8, 1881 – May 24, 1893
 Edward Allen Fulton – postmaster of Monticello March 1, 1871 – March 29, 1874; May 29, 1871 – December 17, 1875 (also Arkansas House)
 Mifflin Wistar Gibbs – American consul to Madagascar 1897 (also judge)
 William H. Lacy – postmaster of Harwood Island February 16, 1885 – August 2, 1893
 James W. Mason – postmaster of Sunny Side February 2, 1867 – April 11, 1871 (also Arkansas Senate, probate judge, and sheriff)
 James A. Roper – postmaster of Surrounded Hill May 9, 1889 – June 22, 1893
 William A. Sloan – postmaster of Ripley July 16, 1891 – April 14, 1894

Local offices
 Mifflin Wistar Gibbs – Little Rock judge 1873 (also consul)
 James W. Mason – probate judge, Chicot County sheriff 1872–1874 (also Arkansas Senate and postmaster)
 Carl R. Polk – Jefferson County justice of the peace (also Arkansas House)

California

Local offices 

 Edward P. Duplex – mayor of  Wheatland 1888

Colorado

Colorado House of Representatives
 John T. Gunnell – Arapahoe County 1881
 Joseph H. Stuart – Arapahoe County 1895

Other state offices
 Henry O. Wagoner – clerk in the Colorado Legislature 1876

Florida

Florida Senate
 William Bradwell – Duval County 1868
 Henry Wilkins Chandler – Marion County 1880–1888   
 Oliver J. Coleman – 10th District 1874 (also Florida House and county commissioner)
 Harry Cruse – 6th District 1869, 1870 (also Florida House)
 T. V. Gibbs – Duval County 1881
 Frederick Hill – Gadsden County 1871 (also Florida House, Florida Constitutional Convention, and postmaster)
 Joseph E. Lee – 18th District/Duval County 1881 (also Florida House and postmaster)
 Thomas Warren Long – Marion County 1873–1879
 Daniel C. Martin – Alachua County 1885, 1887
 Robert Meacham – 9th District 1868–1877, 1879 (also Florida Constitutional Convention, clerk of the circuit court, superintendent of common schools, and postmaster)
 Alfred Brown Osgood – 10th District 1875, 1876 (also Florida House)
 Charles H. Pearce – Leon County 1870–1874 (also Florida Constitutional Convention)
 Washington Pope – 3rd District 1873–1876 (also county commissioner)
 John E. Proctor – Leon County 1883 (also Florida House)
 Egbert Sammis – Duval County 1885 (also consul in Stuttgart)
 Samuel Spearing – Duval County 1874
 John Wallace – Leon County 1874–1879 (also Florida House and county constable)
 Josiah T. Walls – Alachua and Levy counties 1869–1871, 1877–1881 (also U.S. Congress, Florida House, and Florida Constitutional Convention)

Florida House of Representatives 
 Edward I. Alexander – Madison County 1877, 1879, 1885 (also postmaster)
 Samuel Anderson – Duval County 1887
 Josiah Haynes Armstrong – Columbia County 1871, 1875
 Henry Black – Jefferson County 
 Richard Horatio Black – Alachua County 1869, 1870
 Killis B. Bonner – Marion County 1879
 William Bradwell – Duval County 1868–1870
 Richard Lewis Brown Sr. – Duval County 1881, 1883
 James D. Bryant – Monroe County
 Wallace B. Carr – Leon County 1881, 1887 (also Florida Constitutional Convention)
 Phillip Carroll – Leon County 1881
 Joseph Newman Clinton – Alachua County 1881–1883
 George C. Coleman  – Nassau County 1881
 Oliver J. Coleman – Madison County 1871, 1872, 1875 (also Florida Senate and county commissioner)
 Singleton Coleman – Marion County 1873
 Robert Cox – Leon County 1868–1870
 Harry Cruse – Gadsden County 1871–1874, 1877 (also Florida Senate)
 Robert H. Dennis – Jackson County 1875 
 Zebulon Elijah – Escambia County 1871–1873 (also postmaster)
 Auburn H. Erwin – Columbia County 1868–1870 (also Florida Constitutional Convention)
 Lucien Fisher – Leon County 1875
 John Ford – Leon County
 Emanuel Fortune – Jackson County 1868–1870 (also Florida Constitutional Convention)
 Samuel W. Frazier – Leon County 1879, 1885, 1887 (also a justice of the peace)
 Robert Gabriel – Monroe County 1879
 Theodore Gass – Alachua County 1871–1875
 Thomas Van Renssalaer Gibbs – Duval County 1884 
 Birch Gibson – Marion County 1872
 Noah Graham – Leon County 1868–1872
 Alfred Grant – Duval County 1875, 1877
 Henry Harmon – Alachua County 1868–1870
 Frederick Hill – Gadsden County 1868–1870 (also Florida Senate, Florida Constitutional Convention, and postmaster)
 David E. Jacobs – Marion County 1887
 Scipio Jasper – Marion County 1872
 Andrew Jackson Junius – Jefferson County 1879
 Isaac Jenkins – Leon County 1880–1883 
 Andrew Jackson Junius – Jefferson County 1879
 Joseph E. Lee – Duval County 1875, 1877, 1879 (also Florida Senate and postmaster) 
 Matthew M. Lewey – Alachua County 1883 (postmaster and mayor) 
 George A. Lewis – Jacksonville County 1889
 Robert Livingston – Leon County 1868–1869

 Alfred Brown Osgood – Madison County 1868–1874,1879, 1883, 1885 (also Florida Senate)
 Samuel Petty – Nassau County 1873 (also Florida Constitutional Convention)
 George Willis Proctor – Jefferson County 1883  
 John E. Proctor – Leon County 1873–1875, 1879–1881 (also Florida Senate)
 I. E. Purcell – Putnam County
 Jesse Robinson – Jackson County 1868–1874
 Riley Edward Robinson – Nassau County 1883, 1885 (also postmaster)
 William K. Robinson – Jackson County 1872
 William U. Saunders – Gadsden County (also Florida Constitutional Convention)
 John R. Scott Sr. – Duval County 1868–1873
 John R. Scott Jr. – Duval County 1889–1891
 Charles Shavers  – Monroe County 1887
 John Simpson – Marion County 1868–1870
 Samuel Small – Marion County 1874
 William G. Stewart – Leon County 1873
 John N. Stokes – Leon County 1874
 Benjamin Thompson – Jefferson County 1868–1870
 Charles H. Thompson – Columbia County 1868–1870
 William F. Thompson – Leon County 1877 (also Florida Constitutional Convention).
 Thomas Urquhart – Hamilton County and Suwannee County 1868 (also Florida Constitutional Convention)
 John Wallace – Leon County 1870, 1872 (also Florida Senate and constable)
 Josiah T. Walls – Alachua County 1868 (also U.S. Congress, Florida Senate, and Florida Constitutional Convention)
 George Washington – Alachua County 1874–1876
 Randolph W. Washington – Jefferson County 1885
 Richard H. Wells – Leon County 1868–1872 (also Florida Constitutional Convention)
 George Walter Wetmore – Duval County 1883, 1885 
 Wesley Asbury Wilkinson – Marion County 1881, 1883, 1885
 George Washington Witherspoon – Jefferson County 1875
 John W. Wyatt – Leon County 1870–1874

Florida Constitutional Convention 

 Wallace B. Carr – Leon County 1885 (also Florida House) 
 Auburn H. Erwin – Columbia and Baker counties 1868 (also Florida House)
 Emanuel Fortune – Jackson County 1868 (also Florida House)
 Jonathan Clarkson Gibbs – Duval County 1868 (also  Florida Secretary of State and Florida Secretary of Public Instruction)
 Frederick Hill – Gadsden County 1868 (also Florida Senate, Florida House, and postmaster)
 Major Johnson – 1868
 Robert Meacham – Jefferson County 1868 (also Florida Senate, clerk of the circuit court, superintendent of common schools, and postmaster)
 Anthony Mills – Jefferson County 1868 (also Florida House)
 Charles H. Pearce – Leon and Wakulla counties 1868 (also Florida Senate)
 Samuel Petty – Nassau County 1885 (also Florida House)
 William U. Saunders – Gadsden County 1868 (also Florida House)
 Thomas Urquhart  – Hamilton County and Suwannee County 1868 (also Florida House)
 Josiah T. Walls  –  Alachua County 1868 (also U.S. Congress, Florida Senate, Florida House)
 Richard H. Wells – Leon and Wakulla counties, 1868 – February 20, 1868 (also Florida House)
 John W. Wyatt  –  Leon County 1868

Other state offices 

 Jonathan Clarkson Gibbs – Florida Secretary of State 1868–1872 and Florida Secretary of Public Instruction (also Florida Constitutional Convention)

Federal offices 
 Edward I. Alexander – postmaster of Madison County (also Florida House)
 Joseph E. Clark – postmaster of Eatonville May 25, 1889 – September 7, 1907
 Zebulon Elijah – postmaster of Pensacola January 30, 1874 – February 14, 1878 (also Florida House)
 Thomas S. Harris– postmaster of Live Oak September 17, 1898 – March 2, 1905
 Fannie A. James – postmaster of Jewell (now Lake Worth) August 22, 1889 – April 15, 1903
 Frederick Hill – postmaster of in Quincy (also Florida House, Florida Senate, Florida Constitutional Convention, and county commissioner)
 Joseph E. Lee – postmaster of (also Florida House and Florida Senate)
 Matthew M. Lewey – postmaster of Newnansville February 19, 1874 – February 8, 1875 (also Florida House and mayor)
 Robert Meacham – postmaster of Monticello February 19, 1869 – March 22, 1871 (also Florida Senate, Florida Constitutional Convention, clerk of the circuit court, and superintendent of common schools)
 Riley Edward Robinson – postmaster of Kings Ferry (also Florida House)
 Egbert Sammis – consul in Stuttgart (also Florida Senate)
 Emmanuel Smith – postmaster of Apalachicola October 13, 1881 – May 5, 1885
 William G. Stewart – postmaster of Tallahassee March 26, 1873 – July 20, 1885

Local offices 
Columbus H. Boger – mayor of Eatonville 1887
Mitchell Chapelle – mayor of LaVilla (now part of Jacksonville)
Oliver J. Coleman – county commissioner and Madison councilman (also Florida House and Florida Senate)
James Dean – Monroe County judge 1889
Charles Dupont – sheriff of Monroe County 
Samuel W. Frazier – justice of the peace for Lean County 1872–1873 (also Florida House)
Frederick Hill – Gadsen County commissioner (also Florida House, Florida Senate, Florida Constitutional Convention, postmaster)
Matthew M. Lewey – mayor of Newnansville 1875–1877 (also Florida House and postmaster)
George H. Mays – marshal of Jacksonville
Robert Meacham – clerk of the circuit court Jefferson County 1868  and superintendent of commons schools Jefferson County 1869 (also Florida Senate, Florida Constitutional Convention, and postmaster)
James Page – Leon County commissioner
Washington Pope – Jackson County county commissioner 1870–1873 (also Florida Senate)
John Wallace – constable of Leon County (also Florida House and Floridan Senate)

Georgia
In Georgia, 69 African Americans served in the state legislature or as delegates to the state's constitutional convention between 1867 and 1872.

Georgia State Senate
 Aaron Alpeoria Bradley – Chatham, Bryan, and Effingham counties 1868 (also Georgia Constitutional Convention and postmaster)
 Tunis Campbell Sr. – Liberty, McIntosh, and Tattnall counties 1868, 1870, 1871 (also Georgia Constitutional Convention and justice of the peace)
 George Wallace – Hancock, Baldwin, and Washington counties 1868, 1870 (also Georgia Constitutional Convention)

Georgia House of Representatives 
 Thomas M. Allen – Jasper County 1868, 1870
 Eli Barnes – Hancock County 1868, 1870
 Thomas P. Beard – Richmond County 1868, 1870
 Edwin Belcher – Wilkes County 1868 (also postmaster)
 James Blue – Glynn County 1871–1877
 Thomas M. Butler – Camden County 1878
 Tunis Campbell Jr. – McIntosh County 1868, 1870
 Malcolm Claiborne – Burke County 1868, 1870 (also Georgia Constitutional Convention)
 Abram Colby – Greene County 1866, 1868, 1870
George H. Clower – Monroe County 1868, 1870
 John T. Costin – Talbot County 1868, 1870
 Lectured Crawford – McIntosh County 1886–1887, 1890–1891, 1900–1901
 Madison Davis – Clarke County 1868, 1871 (also postmaster)
 Monday Floyd – Morgan County 1868, 1870
 F. H. Fyall – Macon County 1868
 Samuel Gardner – Warren County 1868, 1870
 William A. Golden – Liberty County 1868, 1870
 William Guilford – Upson County 1868
 R. B. Hall – Burke County 1868, 1870
 William Henry Harrison – Hancock County 1868, 1870 (also Georgia Constitutional Convention)
 Jack Heard – Greene County 1873
 John M. Holzendorf – Camden County 1890
 Ulysses L. Houston – Bryan County 1868, 1870
 Philip Joiner –  Dougherty County 1868, 1870, 1871 (also Georgia Constitutional Convention)
 J. A. Lewis – Stewart County 1871
 George Linder – Laurens County 1868, 1870 (also Georgia Constitutional Convention)
 Robert Lumpkin – Macon County 1868, 1870 (also Georgia Constitutional Convention)
 H. A. McKay – Liberty County 1900
 Romulus Moore – Columbia County 1868, 1870 (also Georgia Constitutional Convention)
 Peter O'Neal – Baldwin County 1868, 1870
 James Ward Porter – Chatham County 1868, 1870, 1871
 Alfred Richardson – Clarke County 1868, 1870
 Amos Rogers – McIntosh County 1878
 A. Simmons – Houston County 1871
 James M. Simms – Chatham County 1868, 1870
 Abraham Smith – Muscogee County 1868, 1870
 Alexander Stone – Jefferson County 1868, 1870 (also Columbia County)
 Henry McNeal Turner – Bibb County 1868, 1870, 1871 (also Georgia Constitutional Convention and postmaster)
 John Warren – Glynn County 1868, 1870
 Samuel Williams – Harris County 1868, 1870 (also Georgia Constitutional Convention)
 A. Wilson – Camden County 1884
 Hercules Wilson – McIntosh County 1882–1885

Georgia Constitutional Convention 

 Simeon Beard – 18th District/Jefferson County 1867
 Aaron Alpeoria Bradley – 1st District 1867 (also Georgia Senate and postmaster)
 Tunis Campbell – 2nd District 1867 (also Georgia Senate and justice of the peace)
 Malcolm Claiborne – 17th District/Burke County 1867 (also Georgia House)
 William Henry Harrison – 20th District/Hancock County 1867 (also Georgia House)
 Philip Joiner – 10th District 1867/Dougherty County (also Georgia House)
 George Linder –16th District/Laurens County 1867 (also Georgia House)
 Robert Lumpkin – 13th District/ Macon County 1867 (also Georgia House)
 Romulus Moore – 29th District 1867/Columbia County (also Georgia House)
 Alexander Stone – 18th District/Jefferson County 1867 (also Georgia House)
 Henry McNeal Turner – 22nd District/Bibb County 1867 (also Georgia House and postmaster)
 George Wallace – 20th District 1867 (also Georgia Senate)
 Samuel Williams – 25the District/Harris County (also Georgia House)

Federal offices 

 J. Curt Beall – postmaster of La Grange September 6, 1882 – August 6, 1885
 Edwin Belcher – postmaster of Macon March 22, 1873 – March 23, 1875 (also Georgia House)
 Aaron Alpeoria Bradley – postmaster of in Macon (also Georgia Constitutional Convention and Georgia Senate)
 John H. Clopton – postmaster of Hogansville March 1, 1890  –April 8, 1893
 Madison Davis – postmaster of Athens February 13, 1882 – June 2, 1890; February 15, 1886 – May 27, 1893 (Georgia House)
 Jacob D. Enos or Enis – postmaster of Valdosta May 4, 1869 – June 8, 1871
 Charles R. Jackson – postmaster of Darien October 15, 1890 – September 14, 1897; June 19, 1893 – May 18, 1909
 Isaiah H. Loftin – postmaster of Hogansville May 17, 1897 – March 2, 1900
 Monroe B. Morton – postmaster of Athens July 27, 1897 – February 6, 1902
 Luther J. Price – postmaster of South Atlanta June 18, 1889 – June 21, 1893
 Ellic L. Simon – postmaster of South Atlanta July 2, 1897 – October 31, 1904
 Henry McNeal Turner – postmaster of Macon May 18, 1869 – August 10, 1869 (also Georgia House and Georgia Constitutional Convention)

Local offices 
 Tunis Campbell Sr. – justice of the peace (also Georgia Senate and Georgia Constitutional Convention)
 William Finch – Fourth Ward, Atlanta Board of Aldermen 1892 (now Atlanta City Council)
 George Graham – Third Ward, Atlanta Board of Aldermen 1892 (now Atlanta City Council)

Idaho

Federal offices 
 John B. Mitchell – postmaster of Delta October 10, 1890 – November 16, 1894

Illinois

Illinois House of Representatives
 James E. Bish – Cook County 1895
 John C. Buckner – 5th District 1899–1903
 George French Ecton – 3rd District/Chicago 1888
 William L. Martin – Cook County 1898
 Edward H. Morris – Cook County 1890, 1902
 John W. E. Thomas – 3rd District/Chicago 1877–1879, 1884–1905

Indiana

Indiana did not have African American legislators until after the Reconstruction era.

Indiana House of Representatives 

 James S. Hinton – Marion County 1881 (also trustee of the Wabash and Erie Canal)

Federal offices 

 James Cantrell – postmaster of Lyles September 12, 1898 – February 12, 1920

Kansas 
Kansas did not have African American legislators until after the Reconstruction era.

Kansas House of Representatives 

 Alfred Fairfax – Chautauqua County 1888

Other state offices 

 Edward P. McCabe – Kansas State Auditor (also county clerk, U.S. Treasury Department clerk, and country treasurer in Oklahoma)

Federal offices 

 Frances Jennie Fletcher – postmaster of Nicodemus December 9, 1889 – January 5, 1894
 Zachary T. Fletcher – postmaster of Nicodemus September 12, 1877 – September 2, 1886
 Edward P. McCabe –  clerk in the Cook County office of the U.S. Treasury Department (also country clerk Kansas State Auditor, and county treasurer in Oklahoma)
 George M. Sayers – postmaster of Nicodemus April 27, 1896 – December 20, 1916

Local offices 

 Edward P. McCabe – county clerk for Graham County (also Kansas State Auditor, U.S. Treasury Department clerk, and county treasurer in Oklahoma)

Kentucky

Federal offices 
 John D. Starks – postmaster of Brandenburg November 11, 1899 – September 16, 1890

Louisiana 
Through 1900,  24 African Americans served in the Louisiana Senate during Reconstruction; more than 100 served in the Louisiana House of Representatives. In addition, six African American men held statewide offices in Louisiana, including the nation's first African American acting governors.

Louisiana Governor 
 Oscar James Dunn – acting governor May–July 1871
 P. B. S. Pinchback – acting governor December 1872–January 1873 (also U.S. Senate, Louisiana Lt. Governor, Louisiana Constitutional Convention, and Louisiana Senate)

Louisiana lieutenant governor 
 Caesar Antoine – 1873–1877 (also Louisiana Senate and Louisiana Constitutional Convention)
 Oscar James Dunn – 1868–1871, (also Louisiana Constitutional Convention
 P. B. S. Pinchback – 1872 (also U.S. Senate, acting Louisiana Governor, Louisiana Constitutional Convention, and Louisiana Senate)

Louisiana State Senate 
 Theophile T. Allain – 14th State Senate District/Iberville Parish 1874–1880 (also Louisiana House)
 Caesar Antoine – Caddo Parish 1868–1872 (also Louisiana Lt. Governor and Louisiana Constitutional Convention)
 Alexander E. Barber – Orleans Parish 1868–1874
 Raiford Blunt – West Baton Rouge Parish 1872–1875 (also Louisiana House)
 J. Henry Burch – East Baton Rouge Parish 1872–1880 (also Louisiana House)
 Edward Butler – Plaquemines Parish, Louisiana 1870–1874
 Thomas Cage – Terrebonne Parish 1872–1884 (also Louisiana House)
 Oscar Crozier – Lafourche Parish, 1874–April 1875
 J. S. Davison – Iberville Parish 1880–1884
 Henry Demas – St. John the Baptist Parish 1874–1880, 1884–1892 (also Louisiana House)
 Emile Detiège – St. Martin Parish 1876–1878
 Andrew Dumont – Orleans Parish  1874–1878 (also Louisiana House)
 J. B. Esnard – Iberia Parish 1870–1876
 Alexander R. François – St. Martin Parish 1868–1869
 John Gair - East Feliciana Parish 1868–1876 (also Louisiana Constitutional Convention)
 Jacques Gla – Carroll and Madison parishes 1872, 1874–1880
 Robert F. Guichard – St. Bernard Parish 1884–1892 (also Louisiana House and  Louisiana Constitutional Convention)
 George Hamlet – Ouachita Parish 1876–1880
 William Harper – St. Charles Parish 1872–1876
 J. H. Ingraham – Orleans Parish 1870–1874
 George Y. Kelso – Rapides Parish 1868–1876 (also Louisiana Constitutional Convention)
 Pierre Caliste Landry – Ascension Parish 1874–1878 (also Louisiana House, postmaster, and mayor)
 Jules A. Masicot – Orleans Parish 1872–1876 (also Louisiana House and Louisiana Constitutional Convention)
 Julien J. Monette – 3rd State Senate District/Orleans and St. Bernard parishes 1868
 P. B. S. Pinchback – Orleans Parish 1868–1871 (also U.S. Senate, Louisiana Lt. Governor, acting Louisiana Governor, and Louisiana Constitutional Convention)
 Robert Poindexter – Assumption, Lafourche and St. Landry parishes 1868 (also Louisiana House and Louisiana Constitutional Convention)
 Curtis Pollard – East Carroll Parish 1868–1870, 17th State Senate District 1872–1876 (also Louisiana Constitutional Convention)
 John Randall –  Concordia Parish and Avoyelles Parish 1868–1869 
 Fortune Riard – Orleans Parish 1874–1878 (also Louisiana Constitutional Convention)
 Richard Simms – St. James Parish 1880–1892 (also Louisiana House)
 T. B. Stamps – Jefferson Parish 1872–1880 (also Louisiana House and Louisiana Constitutional Convention)
 Jordan R. Stewart – 9th State Senate District/Terrebonne Parish 1880–1888 (also Louisiana House and Louisiana Constitutional Convention)
 Isaac Sutton – St Mary Parish 1876–1889 (also Louisiana House)
 Simon Toby – Orleans Parish 1884–1888
 Samuel Wakefield – Iberia Parish 1877–1879
 David Young – Concordia Parish 1874–1878 (also Louisiana House)

Louisiana House of Representatives 
 Curron J. Adolphe – New Orleans 1868–1872
 Frank Alexander – New Orleans 1868
 Theophile T. Allain – Iberville Parish 1872, 1879–1888 (also Louisiana Senate)
 Arthur Antoine – St. Mary Parish 1872
 Felix C. Antoine – Orleans Parish 1870–1876
 Raiford Blunt – West Baton Rouge Parish/Natchitoches Parish 1868–1872 (also Louisiana Senate)
 Charles E. Bourgoise – St. Charles Parish 1878–1896
 R. J. Brooks – St. Mary Parish 1876–1880
 Charles F. Brown – Jefferson Parish 1880–1884
 J. Henry Burch – East Baton Rouge Parish 1879 (also Louisiana Senate)
 Thornton Butler – Orleans Parish 1876–1880
 Thomas Cage – Terrebonne Parish 1884–1888 (also Louisiana Senate)
 Henry C. W. CasaCalvo – East Baton Rouge Parish 1892–1896
 John Cayolle – St. John the Baptist Parish 1880-1888
 Royal Coleman – Terrebonne Parish 1878–1884
 Lucien Comaux – Iberville Parish 1880–1884
 Joseph Connaughton (politician) – Rapides Parish 1872–1875
 J. A. Crawford – Franklin Parish 1870–1874
 William Crawford – Union Parish 1870
 P. Darinsburg – Pointe Coupee Parish  1870
 J. S. Davidson – Iberville Parish 1870–1878, 1892-1896
 Aristede Dejoie –  Orleans Parish 1870–1874, 1877
 Henry Demas – St. John the Baptist Parish 1870–1874, 1879 (also Louisiana Senate)
 Vincent Dickerson – St. James Parish 1884–1892
 Rosario Ducoté – Avoyelles Parish 1878–1888
 Andrew Dumont – Orleans Parish 1868–1876
 Ulgar Dupart – Terrebonne Parish 1868 (also Louisiana Constitutional Convention)
 Benjamin Ewell – Assumption Parish 1884–1888
 Victor Fauria  – St. Tammany Parish 1892–1896
 T. H. Francois – Jefferson Parish 1868–1872
 John Gair – East Feliciana Parish 1868, 1872
 Bivien Gardner – Assumption Parish 1880–1884
 R. G. Gardner – Jefferson Parish 1870
 William C. Gary – St. Mary Parish 1876–1880
 Robert F. Guichard – St. Bernard Parish 1872 (also Louisiana Senate and  Louisiana Constitutional Convention)
 William Harper – Caddo Parish 1870
 Governor Hawkins – Madison Parish 1884–1888
 Gloster Hill – Ascension Parish 1876–1880
 Robert Isabelle – Orleans Parish 1868–1876
 W. W. Johnson – Madison County 1884-1888
 H. S. Jones – Iberville Parish 1880–1884
 Milton Jones – Pointe Coupee Parish 1876
 R. M. J. Kenner – New Orleans 1870
 Pierre Caliste Landry – Ascension Parish 1870–1874, 1880–1884 (also Louisiana Senate, postmaster, mayor)
 Charles Leroy – Natchitoches Parish 1868
 Wash Lyons – Terrebonne Parish 1876–1880
 Harry Mahoney – Plaquemine Parish 1872–1884
 Joseph Mansion – Orleans Parish 1868
 Louis A. Martinet – St. Mary Parish 1872–1875
 Jules A. Masicot – Orleans Parish 1868–1872 (also Louisiana Senate and Louisiana Constitutional Convention)
 W. E. McCarthy – Orleans Parish 1868-1872
 J. Monroe – 1868, 1870, 1872
 John J. Moore – St. Mary Parish 1870
 Milton Morris – Ascension Parish 1868–1872 (also Louisiana Constitutional Convention)
 Thomas Murray – Orleans Parish 1870
 William Murrell – Lafourche Parish 1868–1878 
 William Murrell Jr. – Madison Parish 1872–1876, 1878–1880 (also Louisiana Constitutional Convention)
 Anthony Overton, Sr. – Ouachita Parish 1870
 John F. Patty – St. Mary Parish 1884–1888
 Robert Poindexter – Assumption Parish 1874–April 1875 (also Louisiana Senate and Louisiana Constitutional Convention)
 Isham Pollard – Terrebonne Parish 1878
 W. S. Posey – St. Mary Parish 1884–1884
 Robert R. Ray – East Feliciana Parish 1874
 Harry Rey – Natchitoches Parish 1868
 Victor Rochon – St. Mary Parish 1872 – April 1875, 1884–1888
 Cain Sartain – East Carroll Parish 1870–1876
 Richard Simms – St. Landry Parish 1872–1874 (also Louisiana Senate)
 Charles Smith – Terrebonne Parish 1880–1884
 W. B. Smith – St. Mary Parish 1878
 Louis Snaer – Orleans Parish 1872–1876 (also Louisiana Constitutional Convention)
 T. B. Stamps – Jefferson Parish 1870 (also Louisiana Senate and Louisiana Constitutional Convention)
 Jordan R. Stewart – Tensas Parish 1872–1876 (also Louisiana Senate and Louisiana Constitutional Convention)
 Isaac Sutton – St Mary Parish 1872–1876 (also Louisiana Senate)
 Robert J. Taylor – West Feliciana Parish 1868
 George Washington – Concordia Parish 1870–1874, 1877
 Enos Williams – Terrebonne Parish 1876–1884
 Henderson Williams – Madison Parish 1868, 1870 (also Louisiana Constitutional Convention)
 W. C. Williams – East Feliciana Parish 1868, 1870
 Frederick B. Wright – Terrebonne Parish 1874–1878
 David Young – Concordia Parish 1868–1874, 1880–1884 (also Louisiana Senate)

Louisiana Constitutional Convention 

 Caesar Antoine – Caddo Parish 1867–1868 (also Louisiana Lt. Governor and Louisiana Senate)
 Arnold Bertonneau – 1868
 O. C. Blandin – 1867
 Emile Bonnefoi – 1867–1868
 H. Bonseigneur – 1867
 Emile Burrel – 1868
 Dennis Burrell  – 1867
 William Butler – 1867–1868
 R. I. Cromwell – 1867–1868
 Pierre G. Deslonde – Iberville Parish 1867–1868 (also Louisiana Secretary of State)
 A. Donato – 1867
 Oscar Dunn – 1867 (also Lt. Governor of Louisiana)
 Gustave Dupart – 1867
 Ulgar Dupart – Terrebonne Parish 1867–1868 (also Louisiana House)
 Jean–Baptiste Esnard – St. Mary Parish 1870–1876
 Louis Francois – 1867–1868
 John Gair – 1867 (also Louisiana Senate)
 R. G. Gardiner – 1867–1868
 Leopold Guichard – 1867
 Robert F. Guichard – Saint Bernard Parish 1868 (also Louisiana Senate and Louisiana House)
 James H. Ingraham – 1867
 R. H. Isabelle – 1867–1868
 Thomas Isabelle – 1867–1868
 George Y. Kelso – Rapides Parish 1867–1868 (also Louisiana Senate)
 Victor Lange – 1868
 Charles Leroy – 1867–1868
 J. B. Lewis – 1867–1868
 Richard Lewis – 1867–1868
 Theophile Mahier – 1868
 Thomas M. Martin – 1867–1868
 Jules A. Masicot – Third District 1867–1868 (also Louisiana House and Louisiana Senate)
 William R. Meadows – 1867–1868
 ? Monroe – 1868
 Milton Morris – 1867–1868 (also Louisiana House)
 R. S. Moses – 1867–1868
 William Murrell Jr. – Madison Parish 1867–1868 (also Louisiana House)
 P. B. S. Pinchback – 1867–1868 (also U.S. Senate, Louisiana Lt. Governor, Louisiana Senate, and Louisiana acting governor)
 Robert Poindexter – Assumption Parish 1867–1868 (also Louisiana Senate and Louisiana House)
 Curtis Pollard – Franklin Parish and Madison Parish 1867–1868 (also Louisiana Senate)
 Fortune Riard – 1867 (also Louisiana Senate)
 D. D. Riggs – 1867–1868
 J.. A. H. Roberts – 1867–1868
 L. B. Rodriguez – 1867
 ? Scott – 1868
 Louis Snaer – Saint Martin Parish 1868 (also Louisiana House)
 Sosthen L. Snaer – 1867
 T. B. Stamps – Jefferson Parish 1879 (also Louisiana Senate and Louisiana House)
 Jordan R. Stewart – Terrebonne Parish 1879 (also Louisiana House and Louisiana Senate)
 C. A. Thibault – 1867
 Edouard D. Tinchant – 1867
 P. F. Valfroit – 1867–1868
 Henderson Williams – Madison Parish 1867–1868 (also Louisiana House)
 David Wilson – 1867–1868

Other state offices 
 William C. Brown – Louisiana Superintendent of Education 1872–1876
 Pierre G. Deslonde – Secretary of State 1872–1876 (also Louisiana Constitutional Convention)
 Antoine Dubuclet – state treasurer 1876–1877

Federal offices 

 Henry Bloch – postmaster of Opelousas March 26, 1891 – September 7, 1891
 Samuel E. Cuny or Cuney – postmaster of Colfax March 15, 1872 – April 1873
 Abraham Davis – postmaster of Franklin June 3, 1872 – March 21, 1881; January 17, 1880 – April 11, 1887
 Timothy Davis – postmaster of Pattersonville (became Patterson in 1887) May 3, 1882 – December 30, 1892
 Anna M. Dumas – postmaster of Covington November 15, 1872 – June 18, 1885
 Pierre Caliste Landry – postmaster of Donaldsonville March 3, 1871 – May 25, 1875 (also Louisiana House, Louisiana Senate, mayor) 
 Charles Leroy – postmaster of Natchitoches April 29, 1869 – September 18, 1872
 Friday N. Porter Jr. – postmaster of Pearl River (became Pearlville in 1888) October 6, 1875 – May 6, 1893
 Charles W. Ringgold – postmaster of New Orleans March 1, 1873 – April 6, 1875
 James H. Stephens – postmaster of Saint Francisville April 1, 1872 – December 8, 1879
 John A. Washington – postmaster of Vidalia October 20, 1873 – May 15, 1876

Local offices 
 Monroe Baker – mayor of St. Martinville 1867
 Thomas Morris Chester – superintendent of school district 1875
 Oscar Dunn – New Orleans Board of Aldermen 1867
 Pierre Caliste Landry – mayor of Donaldsonville (also Louisiana House, Louisiana Senate, and postmaster)
 James Lewis – administrator of public improvements in New Orleans 1872, Orleans naval officer 1877
 Pierre Magloire – Avoyelles Parish sheriff 1872
 Alexander Noguez – Avoyelles Parish sheriff 1868–1872

Maryland

Federal offices 

 Nathan Johnson – postmaster of Sugarland February 6, 1896 – May 15, 1905
 Warren R. Wade – postmaster of Malcolm February 3, 1890 – September 24, 1901

Local offices 
 Wiley H. Bates – Annapolis Board of Aldermen 1897–1899
 William H. Butler – Annapolis Board of Aldermen 1873–1875
 William H. Butler Jr. – Annapolis Board of Aldermen 1893–1897
 John Marcus Cargill – Baltimore City Council 1895-1897
 Harry Sythe Cummings – Baltimore City Council 1891, 1892, 1898
 Hiram Watty – Baltimore City Council 1899 and 1905

Massachusetts

Massachusetts House of Representatives
 William O. Armstrong – Ward 9 1887
 Julius C. Chappelle – Boston 9th Ward/9th Suffolk District 1883–1886
 Charles E. Harris – Boston 1892 (also Boston Common Council)
 Lewis Hayden – Boston 1873
 Andrew B. Lattimore – Boston 1889 (also Boston Common Council)
 George W. Lowther – Boston 9th Ward 1878
 Charles Lewis Mitchell – 6th Suffolk District 1866
 William L. Reed – Boston 1896
 George Lewis Ruffin – 6th Suffolk District 1870 (also Boston City Council and  judge)
 John J. Smith – 6th Suffolk District 1868, 1872
 Joshua Bowen Smith – Cambridge 1873
 Robert T. Teamoh – Boston 9th Ward 1894
 Edward G. Walker – Middlesex County 3rd District 1866

Local offices 

 Macon Bolling Allen – Justice of the Peace for Middlesex County (also probate judge in South Carolina)
 Charles E. Harris – Boston Common Council (also Massachusetts House)
 Andrew B. Lattimore –  Ward 9 Boston Common Council (also Massachusetts House)
 George Lewis Ruffin – Boston City Council 1875–1877 and  judge in the Municipal Court, Charlestown District, Boston (also Massachusetts House)

Michigan

Michigan House of Representatives
 Joseph H. Dickinson – Wayne County 1897
 William Webb Ferguson – Wayne County 1893

Other state offices 
 Samuel C. Watson – State Board of Estimates 1875; Detroit City Council 1875, 1883–1886

Minnesota
Minnesota did not have any African American legislators until after the Reconstruction era.

Minnesota House of Representatives 
John Francis Wheaton – District 42, 1899–1900

Mississippi
The Mississippi Plan was part of an organized campaign of terror and violence used by the Democratic Party and Ku Klux Klan to disenfranchise African Americans in Mississippi, block them from holding office, end Reconstruction, and restore white supremacy in the state. Nevertheless, many African Americans served in its legislature and Mississippi was the only state that elected African American candidates to the U.S. Senate during the Reconstruction era; a total of 37 African Americans served in the Senate and 117 served in the House.

Mississippi Lieutenant Governor 
 Alexander Kelso Davis – Lieutenant Governor 1870-1873 (also Mississippi House)

Mississippi Secretary of State 

 Hannibal C. Carter – 1873, 1874 (also Mississippi House)
 James Hill – 1874–1878 (also Mississippi House)
 James D. Lynch – 1869–1872
 Murdock M. McLeod – October–November 1873 (also Mississippi House)
 Hiram Rhodes Revels – 1872–1873 (also U.S. Senate)

Mississippi State Senate
 George W. Albright – Marshall County 1874–1879 
 Peter Barnabas Barrow – Warren County 1872–1875 (also Mississippi House)
 Countelow M. Bowles – Bolivar County 1872–1874, 1877–1878 (also Mississippi House)
 Charles Caldwell – Hinds County 1870–1875 (also Mississippi Constitutional Convention)
 George Washington Gayles – Bolivar County 1878–1886 (also Mississippi House)
 Robert Gleed – Lowndes County 1870–1875
 William H. Gray – Washington County 1870–1875
 Nathan Shirley – Monroe and Chickasaw counties 1874–1879
 George C. Smith – Coahoma County 1874–1875
 Isham Stewart – Noxubee County 1874–1879 (also Mississippi House and Mississippi Constitutional Convention)
 Thomas W. Stringer – Warren County 1870–1871
 George W. White – Wilkinson County 1874–1875 (also Mississippi House)
 Jeremiah M. P. Williams – Adams County 1870–1874, 1878–1880

Mississippi House of Representatives 
 William H. Allen – Coahoma County 1884–1887
 L. K. Altwood – Hinds County 1880, 1884
 Peter Barnabas Barrow – Warren County 1870–1871 (also Mississippi Senate)
 Monroe Bell – Hinds County 1872
 Stephen Blackwell – Issaquena County 1882–1889 
 Jesse Freeman Boulden – Lowndes County 1870
 Countelow M. Bowles – Bolivar County 1870 (also Mississippi Senate)
 George F. Bowles – Adams County 1881–1894
 Anderson Boyd – Oktibbeha County 1874
 George W. Boyd – Warren County 1874
 Walter Boyd – Yazoo County 1874
 Arthur Brooks – Monroe County 1872
 Frank P. Brooks – Sharkey County 1866
 George P. A. Brown – Tunica County 1875
 Orange Brunt – Panola County 1874
 Joseph Henry Bufford – Bolivar County 1880
 Charles W. Bush – Warren County 1872
 George William Butler – Sharkey County 1884–1894 
 J. Wesley Caradine – Clay County 1874
 Hannibal C. Carter – Warren County 1872, 1876 (also Mississippi Secretary of State) 
 James Cessor – Jefferson County 1872–1877
 George Charles – Lawrence County 1870
 George Washington Chavis – Warren County 1874
 Benjamin Chiles – Oktibbeha County 1874–1878
 Richard Christmas – Copiah County 1874
 Charles P. Clemens – Clarke County 1874
 Milton Coates – Warren County 1882–1885
 John Cocke – Panola County 1872
 Felix L. Cory – Adams County 1884–1886
 Thomas A. Cotton – Noxubee County 1874
 Henry Craytin – Yazoo County 1880
 Robert Cunningham – Marshall County 1878
 Alexander Kelso Davis – Noxubee County 1870–1873 (also Lieutenant Governor)
 Willis Davis – Noxubee County 1874–1876
 James M. Dickson – Yazoo County 1872
 George Edwards – Madison County 1878
 Weldon W. Edwards – Warren County 1874–1877, 1882
 Alfred Fields – Panola County 1880
 Samuel Fitzhugh – Wilkinson County 1874–1876 
 Hugh M. Foley – Wilkinson County 1870, 1873
 William Henderson Foote – Yazoo County 1870
 George Washington Gayles – Bolivar County 1872–1875 (also Mississippi Senate)
 J. H. Glenn – Lowndes County 1874
 George Caldwell Granberry – Hinds County 1882
 David S. Green – Grenada County 1872–1875 
 Richard Griggs  – Issaquena County 1870, 1872 (also Commissioner of Agriculture & Immigration)
 Alfred Newton Handy – Madison County 1870–1875
 Emanuel Handy – Copiah County 1870–1873
 John F. Harris – Washington County 1890 
 W. H. Harris – Washington County 1874, 1888
 Henry H. Harrison – Chickasaw County 1874
 Charles P. Head – Warren County 1870
 William W. Hence – Adams County 1880
 Ambrose Henderson – Chickasaw County 1870
 John Franklin Henry – Madison County 1884
 Weldon Hicks – Hinds County 1874, 1878
 Wilson Hicks – Rankin County 1874
 David Higgins – Oktibbeha County 1870
 James Hill – Marshall County 1872 (also Secretary of State of Mississippi)
 William Holmes – Monroe County 1870–1873
 D. H. Hopson – Coahoma County 1888
 Gilbert Horton – Washington County 1884
 Russell Walker Houston – Issaquena County 1872
 Merrimon Howard – Jefferson County 1870 (also sheriff)
 Perry Howard – Holmes County 1872–1875
 George W. Huntley – Bolivar County 1888
 Henry L. Jackson – Rankin County 1888
 Henry P. Jacobs – Adams County 1870, 1872
 David Jenkins – Madison County 1876 
 Albert Johnson – Warren County 1870–1876
 J. H. Johnson – DeSoto County 1872–1875 
 John Johnson – Madison County 1886–1887 
 William Johnson – Hinds County 1872 
 Cornelius J. Jones – Issaquena County 1890 
 William H. Jones – Issaquena County 1874–1877 
 Reuben Kendrick – Amite County 1872–1875 
 William Landers – Jefferson County 1872–1876
 Matthew Levy – Madison County 1882
 Samuel W. Lewis – Madison County 1884
 William Lucius Lowe – Bolivar County 1886
 John R. Lynch – Adams County 1872, 1874; Speaker of the House 1872–1873 (also U.S. Congress)
 William H. Lynch – Adams County 1874–1877, 1882–1889 
 William H. Mallory – Warren County 1872, LeFlore County and Sunflower County 1875 
 James G. Marshall – Holmes County 1878 
 Daniel T. J. Mathews – Panola County 1874
 Henry Mayson – Hinds County 1870 (also Mississippi Constitutional Convention)
 Thomas McCain – DeSoto County 1872–1875
 J. W. McFarland – Rankin County 1874
 Murdock M. McLeod – Hinds County 1884 (also Mississippi of Secretary State)
 Marshall McNeese – Noxubee County 1870, 1874–1877 
 Cicero Mitchell – Holmes County 1870, 1878
 Peter Mitchell – Washington County 1882, 1886
 Joseph E. Monroe – Coahoma County 1874–1877  
 James Aaron Moore – Lauderdale County 1870 (also Mississippi Constitutional Convention)
 L. C. Moore – Bolivar County 1890  
 Lemuel C. Moore – Issaquena County 1880, 1884  
 John H. Morgan – Washington County 1870–1875
 George G. Mosely – Hinds County 1874
 Cato Nathan – Monroe County 1874
 Randle Nettles – Oktibbeha County 1870–1873
 Matthew T. Newsom – Claiborne County 1870 (also Mississippi Constitutional Convention)
 C. F. Norris – Hinds County 1870
 George H. Oliver – Coahoma County 1890
 Lawrence W. Overton – Noxubee County 1876 
 Jones R. Parker – Washington County 1884
 James G. Patterson – Yazoo County 1874
 Alfred Peal – Marshall County 1874
 Perry Peyton – Bolivar County 1884
 James H. Piles – Panola County 1870–1875 (also Assistant Secretary of State)
 Albert B. Poston – Panola County 1882
 J. W. Randolph – Sunflower County and Leflore County 1874
 Charles Reese – Hinds County 1872
 Elzy Richards – Lowndes County 1872–1875
 Samuel Riley – Wilkinson County 1876
 William M. Robinson – Hinds County 1884
 A. A. Rogers – Marshall County 1874
 Jacob Allen Ross – Washington County 1871
 Samuel A. Sanderlin – Washington and Issaquena counties 1876
 Edmund Scarborough – Holmes County, Mississippi 1870
 Henry P. Scott – Issaquena County 1878
 Gray Selby – Marshall County 1880
 Josiah T. Settle – Panola County 1883
 Isaac Shadd – Warren County 1872–1876, Speaker of the House 1874–1875
 James A. Shorter Jr. – Hinds County 1882
 James S. Simmons – Issaquena County and Washington County 1874, 1883
 Adam D. Simpson – Madison County 1877
 Gilbert C. Smith – Tunica County 1872–1875, 1884
 Haskin Smith – Claiborne County 1872–1876 
 Joseph Smothers – Claiborne County 1872–1875
 James J. Spelman – Madison County 1869–1875 (also a justice of the peace)
 Frederick Stewart – Holmes County 1872
 Isham Stewart – Noxubee County 1870–1873 (also Mississippi Senate and Mississippi Constitutional Convention)
 Doctor Stites – Washington County 1870
 Thomas Sykes – Panola County 1872
 Robert Thompson – Lowndes County 1874
 Harrison Truhart – Holmes County 1872–1875 
 Guilford Vaughan – Panola County 1876 
 F. Dora Wade – Yazoo County 1872 
 Jefferson Cobb Walker – Monroe County 1874
 George Washington – Carroll County 1874
 George R. Washington – Adams County 1878
 Tenant Weatherly – Holmes County 1874, 1880
 John D. Webster – Washington County 1872
 Eugene Welborne – Hinds County 1874
 George White – Chickasaw County 1874
 George W. White – Wilkinson County 1870–1873 (also Mississippi Senate)
 Ralph Williams – Marshall County 1873–1875
 Michael Wilson – Marion County 1870 
 Charles A. Yancy – Panola County 1870 (died before being seated) 
 James B. Young – Washington County 1877 
 James M. Young – Panola County 1878

Mississippi Constitutional Convention 
 Charles Caldwell – Hinds County 1868 (also Mississippi Senate)
 Amos Drane – Madison County 1868
 Henry Mayson – Hinds County 1868 (also Mississippi House)
 Isaiah Montgomery – Bolivar County 1890 (also mayor and postmaster)
 James Aaron Moore – Lauderdale County (also Mississippi House)
 Matthew T. Newsom – Claiborne County 1868 (also Mississippi House)
 Isham Stewart – Noxubee County 1868 (also Mississippi House and Mississippi Senate)

Other state offices 
 Thomas Cardozo – Mississippi Superintendent of Education
 Hannibal C. Carter – Mississippi Secretary of State September 1, 1873 – October 20, 1873; November 13, 1873 – January 4, 1874 (also Mississippi House)
 Richard Griggs – Mississippi Commissioner of Agriculture & Immigration 1873–1876 (also Mississippi House)
 James Hill – Mississippi Secretary of State January 1874–January 1878 (also Mississippi House)
 James D. Lynch – Mississippi Secretary of State 1868–1872
 James H. Piles – Assistant Secretary of State of Mississippi 1875 (also Mississippi House)
 Hiram Rhodes Revels – Mississippi Secretary of State 1872–1873 (and U.S. Senate)

Federal offices 

 Daniel W. Ambrose – postmaster of Pickens January 19, 1898 – May 11, 1898
 Henry Blackman – postmaster of Brookhaven May 13, 1873 – November 13, 1876
 Benjamin G. Boothe – postmaster of Water Valley July 5, 1884 – December 5, 1885
 Franklin P. Brinson – postmaster of Duncansby September 20, 1897 – May 25, 1905
 Jenkins Cook – postmaster of Dry Grove February 1, 1898 – April 16, 1902
 Minnie M. Cox – postmaster of Indianola January 16, 1891 – May 22, 1897; April 17, 1893 – February 2, 1904
 Robert W. Fitzhugh – postmaster of Natchez January 19, 1876 – October 10, 1883
 Joseph Graves – postmaster of Pearlington March 7, 1883 – April 16, 1889; August 20, 1885 – May 9, 1894
 Edward Hill – postmaster of Raymond June 6, 1870 – May 26, 1874
 James Hill – postmaster of Vicksburg April 2, 1891 – April 15, 1893
 A. D. Jones – postmaster of Corinth February 25, 1871 – March 6, 1874
 Thomas I. Keys – postmaster of Ocean Springs August 4, 1897 – March 3, 1911
 Elias W. Matthews – postmaster of Batesville April 25, 1882 – March 7, 1883
 William McCary – postmaster of Natchez October 10, 1883 – August 6, 1885
 Benjamin F. Mitchell – postmaster of Greenwood July 23, 1873 – October 27, 1875
 Isaiah T. Montgomery – postmaster of Mound Bayou June 12, 1888 – March 14, 1894
 Joshua P. T. Montgomery – postmaster of Mound Bayou March 14, 1894 – May 2, 1895
 Mary V. Montgomery – postmaster of Mound Bayou May 2, 1895 – September 27, 1902
 William Thornton Montgomery – postmaster of Hurricane May 6, 1867 – September 14, 1880
 Ellis E. Perkins – postmaster of Edwards May 12, 1898 – February 15, 1910
 Louis J. Piernas – postmaster of Bay St. Louis April 18, 1889 – May 27, 1898; May 5, 1894 – March 3, 1911
 Thomas Richardson – postmaster of Port Gibson September 28, 1870 – October 6, 1876; February 27, 1890 – February 26, 1875; May 11, 1885 – March 14, 1894
 Robert Steward – postmaster of Macon March 11, 1875 – May 16, 1881
 Henry K. Thomas – postmaster of Bovina June 1, 1877  –December 5, 1882
 Robert H. Wood – postmaster of Natchez March 17, 1873 – April 16, 1876 (also mayor)

Local offices 
 Merrimon Howard – sheriff in Jefferson County (also Mississippi House)
 Isaiah Montgomery – mayor of Mound Bayou (also Mississippi Constitutional Convention and postmaster)
 James J. Spelman – justice of the peace and alderman of Canton (also Mississippi House)
 Robert H. Wood – mayor Natchez 1870–1871;  Adams County Board of Supervisors 1871–1872 (also postmaster)

Missouri

Federal positions 

 James Milton Turner – consul general to Liberia March 1, 1871 – May 7, 1877

Nebraska

Nebraska House of Representatives
 Matthew Oliver Ricketts – 1893–1897

New York

Local offices 

 Edward "Ned" Sherman – mayor of Cleveland 1878

North Carolina

North Carolina Senate 

 Isaac Alston – 19th District/Warren County 1879, 1881
 John R. Bryant – 5th District/Halifax County 1866, 1874, 1876 (also North Carolina House)
 Wilson Carey – Caswell County 1870 (also North Carolina House)
 Hawkins W. Carter – Warren County 1883
 Charles C. Clark – 8th District/Craven County 1887
 Franklin D. Dancy – Edgecombe County 1879–1880
 Henry Eppes – 7th District/Halifax County 1868–1874, 1879, 1887 (also N.C. Constitutional Convention)
 Robert Fletcher – New Hanover County 1870–1874
 Thomas O. Fuller – Warren County 1899–1900
 Abraham Galloway – 13th District/New Hanover County 1868 (N.C. Constitutional Convention) 
 Robert Gray – 5th District/Edgecombe County 1833 (also North Caroline House)
 James Harris – 18th District/Wake County 1872 (also North Carolina House and N.C. Constitutional Convention)
 W. B. Henerson – Vance County 1897–1898
 Hanson T. Hughes – 21st District/Granville County 1866, 1876 (also North Carolina House)
 John Adams Hyman – 20th District/Warren County 1868–1871, 19th District/Warren County 1872 (also U.S. Congress and N.C. Constitutional Convention)
 George Lawrence Mabson – 5th District/Edgecombe County 1866, 1872–1877 (also North Carolina House and N.C. Constitutional Convention)
 George Mebane – Bertie and Northampton counties 1866, 1876, 1883
 Jacob H. Montgomery – (also North Carolina House)
 William H. Moore – 12th District/New Hanover County 1876 (also North Carolina House) 
 John M. Paschall – 19th District/Warren County 1874 (also North Carolina House)
 George W. Price Jr. – 13th District/New Hanover County 1870 (also North Carolina House) 
 H. E. Scott – 12th District/New Hanover County 1881, 1883
 R. S. Taylor – 5th District/Edgecombe County 1885, 1887
 Richard Tucker – 8th District/Craven County 1874
 George L. Watson – New Hanover County 1872–1874
 George Henry White – 8th District/Craven County 1885 (also North Carolina House and U.S. Congress)

North Carolina House of Representatives 

 Israel Abbott – Craven County 1872
 Isaac Alston – Warren County 1879, 1890
 Wiley Baker – Northampton County 1883
 B. W. Battle – Edgecombe County 1879
 William Belcher – Edgecombe County 1883
 W. Henry Brewington – New Hanover County 1874
 Aaron R. Bridgers – Edgecombe County 1883
 John R. Bryant – Halifax County 1870, 1872 (also North Carolina Senate)
 Willis Bunn – Edgecombe County 1870–1877
 Wilson Carey – Craven County 1868, 1874, 1876, 1879, 1889 (also North Carolina Senate)
 Hawkins W. Carter – Warren County 1879
 William Cawthorne – Warren County 1870
 Henry C. Cherry – Edgecombe County 1868 (also N.C. Constitutional Convention)
 L. T. Christmas – Warren County 1879
 Hugh Cole – Pasquotank County 1879
 J. A. Crawford – Granville County 1868, 1870
 C. W. Crews – Granville County 1874, 1876
 H. W. Crews – Person County 1893
 Edward R. Dudley – Craven County 1870, 1872
 Harry B. Eaton – Warren and Vance counties 1883, 1885
 J. Y Eaton – Vance County 1899
 Richard Elliott – Chowan County 1874
 Stewart Ellison – Wake County 1870, 1872, 1879
 Richard Faulkner – Warren County 1868, 1870
 Edward Fletcher – Richmond County 1870
 John R. Good – Craven County 1874
 John S. W. Eagles – New Hanover County 1869-70
 Eustace Edward Green – New Hanover County 1882
 Robert Gray – Edgecombe County 1883 (also North Carolina Senate)
 James Harris – Wake County 1868, 1883, 1895, 1897 (also North Carolina Senate and N.C. Constitutional Convention)
 H. T. J. Hayes – Halifax County 1868 (also N.C. Constitutional Convention)
 Hilliard J. Hewlin – 1883
 Alexander Hicks – Washington County 1881
 Edward H. Hill – Craven County 1874
 J. C. Hill – New Hanover County 1876
 Valentine Howell – New Hanover County 1887
 George W. Howell – Caswell County 1874
 Hanson T. Hughes – Granville County 1866, 1872, 1874 (also North Carolina Senate)
 John E. Hussey – Craven County 1885, 1887, 1889
 Ivey Huthings – Halifax County 1868
 R. M. Johnson – Edgecombe County 1870
 William H. Johnson – 1883
 J. A. Jones – Halifax County 1874
 George H. King – Warren County 1872
 John Sinclair Leary – Cumberland County 1868, 1870
 Bryant Lee – Bertie County 1868
 Alfred Lloyd – New Hanover County 1872, 1874; Pender County 1876
 George Lawrence Mabson – New Hanover County 1870 (also North Carolina Senate)
 Cuffe Mayo – Granville County 1868
 William McLaurin – New Hanover County 1872
 William P. Mabson – Edgecombe County 1872 (also North Carolina Senate and N.C. Constitutional Convention)
 George Mebane – New Hanover County 1868
 Jacob H. Montgomery – Warren County 1883 (also North Carolina Senate)
 William H. Moore – New Hanover County 1874 (also North Carolina Senate)
 Wilson W. Morgan or Willis Morgan – Wake County 1870
 B. T. Morris or B. W. Morris – Craven County 1868
 Noah R. Newby – 1883
 John J. Newell – Bladen County 1874, 1879, 1881
 W. D. Newsome – Hertford County 1870
 James E. O'Hara – Halifax County 1868 (also U.S. Congress and N.C. Constitutional Convention)
 John R. Page – Chowan County 1870
 John W. H. Paschall – Warren County 1872 (also North Carolina Senate)
 Moses M. Peace – Vance County 1895, 1897
 Willis D. Pettipher or Pettiford – Craven County 1879
 James M. Pittman – 1883
 James W. Poe – Caswell County 1883
 George W. Price Jr. – New Hanover County 1868, 1870 (also North Carolina Senate)
 W. H. Reavis – Granvillle County 1870
 John T. Reynolds – Halifax County 1879
 Augustus Robbins – Bertie County 1879, 1881
 Parker David Robbins – Bertie County 1868, 1870 (also North Carolina Constitutional Convention and postmaster)
 Limas Roulhac – Bertie County 1885
 H. E. Scott – New Hanover County 1879
 Isaac H. Smith – Craven County 1899
 Turner R. Speller – Bertie County 1883, 1887, 1889
 A. W. Stevens – Craven County 1868
 Isham Sweat – Cumberland County 1868
 Edward H. Sutton – Chowan County 1883
 Thomas A. Sykes – Pasquotank County 1868–1872 (also Tennessee House)
 B. W. Thorpe – Edgecombe County 1885
 Richard Tucker – Craven County 1870
 William Henry Waddell – New Hanover County 1879, 1883
 James M. Watson – Vance County 1887, 1893
 George Henry White – Craven County 1879, 1881 (also North Carolina Senate and U.S. Congress)
 John A. White – Halifax County 1874, 1876, 1879, 1887
 John H. Williamson – Franklin County 1866–1888 (also North Carolina Constitutional Convention)
 George B. Willis – Craven County 1870
 Dred Wibmerley – Sampson County 1879
 James H. Young – Wake County 1895, 1897

North Carolina Constitutional Convention 

 Wilson Cary – Caswell County 1868, 1875
 Henry C. Cherry – Edgecombe County 1868 (also North Carolina House)
 John O. Crosby –  Warren County 1874
 Henry Eppes – Halifax County 1868 (also North Carolina House)
 A. H. Galloway – New Hanover County 1868 (also North Carolina Senate)
 James Harris – Wake County 1868  (also North Carolina House and North Carolina Senate)
 W. T. J. Hayes – Halifax County 1868 (also North Carolina House)
 Samuel Highsmith – Duplin County 1868
 John Adams Hyman – Warren County 1868 (also U.S. Congress and North Carolina Senate)
 Bryant Lee – Bertie County 1868 
 William P. Mabson – Edgecombe County 1875 (also North Carolina House and North Carolina Senate)
 James E. O'Hara – Halifax County 1875 (also U.S. Congress and North Carolina House)
 J. W. Petterson – Duplin County 1868
 C. D. Pierson – Craven County 1868
 Parker David Robbins – Bertie County 1868 (also North Carolina House and postmaster)
 J. H. Smythe –  New Hanover County 1875
 John H. Williamson – Franklin County 1868 (also North Carolina House)

Federal offices 

 Albert L. Alston – postmaster of Macon December 11, 1891 – April 29, 1893
 Collin P. Anthony – postmaster of Scotland Neck September 17, 1897 – July 11, 1898
 Weeks S. Armstrong – postmaster of Rocky Mount April 18, 1889 – March 31, 1890
 Daniel W. Baker – postmaster of Lewiston June 10, 1897 – April 1, 1899
 Mary A. Baker – postmaster of Dudley November 11 26, 1897 – August 22, 1911
 William Baker – postmaster of South Gaston October 24, 1889 – October 7, 1897; October 13, 1893 – March 31, 1904
 William B. Baker – postmaster of Dudley August 27, 1883 – September 3, 1884
 Clinton W. Battle – postmaster of Battleboro November 11, 1897 – November 22, 1899
 William E. Bennett – postmaster of Powellsville January 13, 1898 – February 23, 1901
 Lewis T. Bond – postmaster of Windsor May 3, 1897 – July 12, 1901
 Albert C. Booth – postmaster of Harrellsville November 15, 1897 – September 26, 1900
 Moses J. Bullock – postmaster of Townsville February 19, 1874 – February 8, 1886
 Thomas H. Burwell – postmaster of Kittrell October 24, 1889 – September 4, 1893
 Joseph B. Catus – postmaster of Winton September 24, 1897 – June 6, 1913
 Edward Cheek – postmaster of Halifax April 9, 1897 – March 7, 1901
 James D. Cherry – postmaster of Drew July 7, 1897 – May 20, 1901
 Edward D. Clark – postmaster of Kelford December 20, 1897 – June 19, 1901
 William C. Coats – postmaster of Seaboard November 9, 1889 – November 3, 1893
 Mrs. Willie F. Coats – postmaster of Seaboard October 26, 1897 – October 26, 1901
 Hezekiah Cook – postmaster of Oberlin April 11, 1892 – May 8, 1894
 Charner H. Davis – postmaster of Townesville (became Townsville 1892) July 20, 1889 – December 10, 1897; September 9, 1893 – January 15, 1909
 Cora E. Davis – postmaster of Halifax April 5, 1889 – December 8, 1890
 Frank Davis – postmaster of Southport February 1, 1892 – May 16, 1893
 Ada Dickens – postmaster of Lawrence August 9, 1897 – November 22, 1899
 Henry H. Falkener – postmaster of Macon May 21, 1890 – December 11, 1891
 Alonzo Green – postmaster of Gatesville May 2, 1870 – April 2, 1878
 Mary Guion – postmaster of Tarheel June 5, 1897 – July 29, 1898
 John H. Hannon – postmaster of Halifax December 8, 1890 – April 10, 1893
 Israel D. Hargett – postmaster of Rocky Mount July 27, 1897 – February 15, 1899
 Cicero B. Harris – postmaster of Panacea Springs (became Panacea in 1894) July 12, 1889 – December 14, 1897; October 23, 1893 – October 2, 1902
 Edmond D. Hart – postmaster of Princeville March 17, 1898 – May 25, 1909
 Benjamin H. Henderson – postmaster of Fayetteville January 21, 1892 – March 3, 1896
 Hilliard J. Hewlin – postmaster of Brinkleyville October 5, 1897 – October 5, 1901
 John H. Howard – postmaster of Weldon January 18, 1898 – June 27, 1902
 Robert S. Jervay – postmaster of Elbow May 12, 1898 – April 15, 1910
 William H. Jones – postmaster of Morehead City February 25, 1890 – June 16, 1893
 Norman L. Keen – postmaster of Essex April 29, 1891 – August 4, 1897; August 16, 1893 – August 6, 1901
 Brosier W. Langford – postmaster of Potecasi July 21, 1897 – January 17, 1898
 George W. Lane – postmaster of Edenton August 1, 1881 – February 24, 1885
 Charles H. Lewter – postmaster of Lewiston April 1, 1899 – November 18, 1901
 Henry D. Mayo – postmaster of Littleton May 26, 1897 – April 13, 1901
 Martha E. Middleton – postmaster of Kenansville August 25, 1892 – May 8, 1893
 Elenora J. Newsome – postmaster of Margarettsville July 2, 1897 – December 21, 1900
 Berry O'Kelly – postmaster of Method October 9, 1890 – April 1, 1931
 William H. Outlaw – postmaster of Windsor April 30, 1891 – April 1, 1893
 W. Lee Person – postmaster of Rocky Mount April 11, 1890 – June 13, 1893
 James M. Pittman – postmaster of Tillery January 23, 1890 – April 9, 1897; July 11, 1893 – October 28, 1898
 George W. Reynolds – postmaster of Murfreesboro October 31, 1889 – April 13, 1892
 Edward A. Richardson – postmaster of New Bern July 18, 1884 – June 11, 1885
 Augustus Robbins – postmaster of Windsor June 14, 1889 – April 30, 1891
 Parker David Robbins – postmaster of Harrellsville September 22, 1875 – October 8, 1877 (also North Carolina Constitutional Convention and North Carolina House)
 Emma S. Roberts – postmaster of Jackson August 6, 1897 – August 7, 1901
 Winfrey H. Roberts – postmaster of Rich Square September 11, 1889 – November 9, 1897; September 19, 1893 – November 9, 1901
 Freeman J. Ryan – postmaster of Quitsna June 24, 1897 – December 15, 1900
 Thomas Shields – postmaster of Scotland Neck July 11, 1898 – May 14, 1901
 Allen A. Smith – postmaster of Mount Olive May 27, 1897 – July 20, 1901
 Henry L. Solomon – postmaster of Ita May 11, 1899 – July 25, 1901
 Washington Spivey – postmaster of James City January 11, 1888 – May 1, 1908
 John H. Thorpe – postmaster of Kittrell January 14, 1898 – March 28, 1902
 Samuel H. Vick – postmaster of Wilson September 28, 1889 – May 24, 1898; February 16, 1894 – March 24, 1903
 Henry L. Watson – postmaster of Macon November 10, 1897 – November 9, 1901
 York Whitehead – postmaster of Aurelian Springs January 19, 1898 – January 20, 1902
 Henry W. Williams – postmaster of Tillery April 8, 1889 – January 23, 1890
 Washington Winn – postmaster of Mount Olive May 31, 1881 – August 6, 1885
 James S. Wortham – postmaster of Ridgeway April 14, 1897 – July 2, 1901
 Winfield F. Young – postmaster of Littleton July 15, 1875 – July 26, 1889; August 3, 1885 – 23, 1893

Ohio

Ohio Senate 
 John Patterson Green – Cleveland and Cuyahoga County 1892 (also Ohio House and justice of the peace)

Ohio House of Representatives 
 Benjamin W. Arnett – Greene County 1886
 Jeremiah A. Brown – Cuyahoga County 1886
 William H. Clifford – Cuyahoga County 1894, 1898
 William H. Copeland – Hamilton County 1888
 John Patterson Green – Cuyahoga County 1882, 1890 (also Ohio Senate and justice of the peace)
 Robert Harlan – Hamilton County 1886
 Samuel B. Hill – Hamilton County 1894
 George H. Jackson – Hamilton County 1892
 William H. Parham – Hamilton County 1896
 Harry Clay Smith – Cuyahoga County 1894–1897, 1900–1901
 William R. Stewart – Mahoning County 1896
 George W. Williams – Hamilton County 1879

Federal offices 

 George W. Harding – postmaster of Wilberforce August 21, 1893 – July 24, 1897

Local offices 
John Patterson Green – justice of the peace for Cuyahoga County 1873 (also Ohio House and Ohio Senate)

Oklahoma

Federal offices 
 William Anderson – postmaster of Udora October 7, 1897 – September 30, 1911
 John G. Crump – postmaster of Zion July 20, 1891 – June 22, 1895
 Samuel G. Garrett – postmaster of Langston June 25, 1891 – February 17, 1894
 William C. Garrett – postmaster of Ridge, Indian Territory December 29, 1884 – March 12, 1886; postmaster of Wellington, Indian Territory July 24, 1890 – November 9, 1891
 Maston Harris – postmaster of Udora November 18, 1895 – October 7, 1897
 Jerry I. Hazelwood – postmaster of Langston April 14, 1898 – September 12, 1914
 David A. Lee – postmaster of Wellington, Indian Territory (became Lee, Indian Territory in 1892) November 9, 1891 – February 15, 1895
 William Martin – postmaster of Wanamaker January 18, 1898 – April 15, 1903
 Abner L. J. Meriwether – postmaster of Lee, Indian Territory August 8, 1898 – November 12, 1902
 Clara M. Overton – postmaster of Wanamaker March 3, 1890 – December 28, 1894
 James A. Roper – postmaster of Okmulgee February 3, 1898 – March 10, 1902
 Charles W. Stevenson – postmaster of Wanamaker December 28, 1894 – April 15, 1903; January 18, 1898 – July 8, 1908
 Lee B. Tatum – postmaster of Tatums May 9, 1896 – September 5, 1911
 Thomas H. Traylor – postmaster of Douglas May 12, 1894 – May 23, 1895
 Stanley Ward – postmaster of Udora February 20, 1895 – November 18, 1895
 Lewis E. Willis – postmaster of Tullahassee January 26, 1899 – October 25, 1905
 John J. Young  – postmaster of Lincoln December 14, 1889 – September 22, 1894

Local offices 
Edward P. McCabe – treasurer of Logan County (also Kansas State Auditor, U.S. Treasury Department clerk in Kansas, and county clerk in Kansas)

Pennsylvania

Federal offices 
 James H. Lyons – postmaster of Salemville July 7, 1882 – July 26, 1893
 Nathan T. Velar – postmaster of Brinton April 29, 1897 – November 26, 1907

Local offices 
 William H. Day – school board of directors at Harrisburg 1879, 1881, 1887

South Carolina 
During Reconstruction, South Carolina was the only state whose legislature was majority African American. Eric Foner says 29 African Americans served in the South Carolina Senate, and 210 African Americans served in the South Carolina House of Representatives. In addition, 72 African Americans participated in the 1868 South Carolina Constitutional Convention. Many others served in various state or local offices ranging from Lt. Governor to justice of the peace.

South Carolina Lt. Governor 
 Richard Howell Gleaves – December 7, 1872 – December 14, 1876
 Alonzo J. Ransier – December 3, 1870 – December 7, 1872 (also U.S. Congress and South Carolina House)

South Carolina Senate 
George W. Barber – Fairfield County 1868–1872
Israel R. Bird – Fairfield County 1876
Lawrence Cain – Edgefield County 1872–1876 (also South Carolina House)
Richard H. Cain – Charleston County 1868 (also U.S. Congress, South Carolina House, South Carolina Constitutional Convention, South Carolina Attorney General, city council)
Henry Cardozo – Kershaw County 1870–1874
Frederick A. Clinton – Lancaster County 1868–1877
Samuel L. Duncan – Orangeburg County 1876–1880 (also South Carolina House)
Sanders Ford – Fairfield County 1872–1873
Samuel E. Gaillard – Charleston County 1870–1877
1868
Samuel Green – Beaufort County 1875–1877 (also South Carolina House)
Charles D. Hayne – Aiken County 1872–1876 (also South Carolina House, South Carolina Constitutional Convention, Secretary of State, and postmaster)
Henry E. Hayne – Marion County 1868–1872 (also South Carolina Constitutional Congress and Secretary of State)
William R. Hoyt – Colleton County 1868
James L. Jamison – Orangeburg County 1870
William R. Jervey – Charleston County 1872 (also South Carolina House and South Carolina Constitutional Convention)
William E. Johnston – Sumter County 1869–1877 (also South Carolina House)
William H. Jones – Georgetown County 1872–1876 (also South Carolina House)
John Lee – Chester County 1872 (also postmaster)
Huston J. Lomax – Abbeville County 1870 (also South Carolina Constitutional Convention)
Moses Martin – Fairfield County 1873–1876
Henry J. Maxwell – Marlboro County 1868 (also postmaster)
Thomas E. Miller – Beaufort County 1874–1880 (also U.S. Congress, South Carolina House, South Carolina Constitutional Convention)
William Fabriel Myers – Colleton County 1874–1878
William B. Nash – Richland County 1868–1877 (also South Carolina Constitutional Convention)
Joseph H. Rainey – Georgetown County 1868–1870 (also U.S. Congress and South Carolina Constitutional Convention)
Benjamin F. Randolph – Orangeburg County 1868 (also South Carolina Constitutional Convention)
Thomas J. Reynolds – Beaufort County
Hamilton Robinson – Beaufort County
Robert Simmons – Berkeley County 1882–1886
Robert Smalls – Beaufort County 1870–1875 (also U.S. Congress, South Carolina House, South Carolina Constitutional Convention, and collector of customs)
Stephen Atkins Swails – Williamsburg County 1868 and president pro tem of the Senate (also South Carolina Continental Convention and mayor)
Dublin I. Walker – Chester County 1874–1877
R. E. Wall – Kershaw County
Jared D. Warley – Clarendon County 1874–1877 (also South Carolina House)
J. H. White – York County
Bruce H. Williams – Chester County 1876–1887
Lucius Wimbush – Chester County 1868–1872
Jonathan Jasper Wright – Beaufort County, South Carolina 1868 (also Associate Justice of South Carolina Supreme Court)

South Carolina House of Representatives 
Frank Adamson – Kershaw County 1870–1874
William Adamson – Kershaw County 1869–1870
Purvis Alexander – Chester County 1876
Jacob C. Allman – Marion County 1872–1876
Robert B. Anderson – Georgetown County 1890–1898 (also postmaster)
William J. Andrews – Sumter County 1874–1876
Robert B. Artson – Charleston County 1872–1874
Samuel J. Bampfield – Beaufort County 1874–1876 (also postmaster)
George W. Barber – Fairfield County 1868–1872
John B. Bascomb – Beaufort County 1870–1874
J. A. Baxter – Georgetown County 1884–1890
W. W. Beckett – Berkeley County 1882
G. A. Bennett – Beaufort County 1868 
Daniel Bird – Fairfield County 1876 
W. A. Bishop – Greenville County 1868–1870
John William Bolts – Georgetown County 1898–1902
Benjamin A. Boseman Jr. – Charleston County 1868–1873 (South Carolina Constitutional Convention and postmaster)
H. Boston – Clarendon County 1876
John Boston – Darlington County 1868, 1872
Joseph D. Boston – Newberry County 1868–1876
James A. Bowley – Georgetown County 1869–1874
E. M. Brayton – Aiken County 1874–1876
Sampson S. Bridges – Newberry County 1872–1876
Peter Bright – Charleston County 1874–1876
Isaac Brockenton – Darlington County (also South Carolina Constitutional Convention)
William J. Brodie – Charleston County 1876–1880
Stephen C. Brown – Charleston County 1868, 1876
Richard Bryan – Charleston County 1870–1874, 1876
H. Z. Burchmeyer – Charleston County 1874–1876
Barney Burton – Chester County 1868–1870 (also South Carolina Constitutional Convention)
Benjamin Byas – Berkeley and Orangeburg counties 1870 (also South Carolina Constitutional Convention)
Edward J. Cain – Orangeburg County 1868
Everidge Cain – Abbeville County 1870–1874
Lawrence Cain – Edgefield County 1868–1872 (also South Carolina Senate)
Richard H. Cain – At-large 1868–1870 and 2nd District 1877 (also U.S. Congress, South Carolina Senate, South Carolina  Attorney General,  South Carolina Constitutional Convention, city council)
Christian Wesley Caldwell – Orangeburg County 1876
Benjamin F. Capers – Charleston County 1876 
John A. Chesnut – Kershaw County 1868 (also South Carolina Constitutional Convention)
Caesar P. Chisolm – Colleton County 1882–1884
J. E. Clyde – Charleston County
Simon P. Coker – Barnwell County 1874
Samuel Coleman – Chester County 1875–1876
Augustus Collins – Clarendon County 1872–1876
Wilson Cooke – Greenville County 1868 (also South Carolina Constitutional Congress)
Andrew W. Curtis – Richland County 1872–1876
Abram Dannerly – Orangeburg County 1872
Nelson Davies – York County 1873–1876
James Davis – Richland County
Thomas A. Davis – Charleston County 1870–1876
Robert C. De Large – Charleston County 1868 (also U.S. Congress, South Carolina Constitutional Convention, State Land Commissioner)
M. R. Delaney – Charleston County
F. DeMars – Orangeburg County 1868 
Eugene Herriot Dibble – Kershaw County 1876
John Dix – Orangeburg County 1872
Samuel B. Doiley – Charleston County 1874–1876
Paul B. Drayton – Charleston County 1880
William A. Driffle – Colleton County 1868–1870, 1880–1882
Samuel L. Duncan – Orangeburg County 1872–1876 (also South Carolina Senate)
S. C. Eckhard – Charleston County 1878–1880
F. S. Edwards – Charleston County 1876
W. T. Elfe – Charleston County 1878–1880
Robert B. Elliott – Barnwell, Edgefield, and Aiken counties 1868, 1874; speaker of the house 1874–1876 (also U.S. Congress, South Carolina Attorney General, South Carolina Constitutional Convention, and county commissioner)
William E. Elliott – Charleston County 1870
Henry H. Ellison – Abbeville County 1870–1874
John Evans – Williamsburg County 1876
Phillip E. Ezekiel – Beaufort County 1868
Simeon Farr – Union County 1868–1872
Simeon Farrow – Union County 1874
T. R. Fields – Beaufort County 1890
Adam P. Ford – Charleston County 1870–1874
Ellis Forrest – Orangeburg County 1876
William H. Frazier – Colleton County 1872 
B. G. Frederick – Orangeburg County 1878–1880, 1882–1884
John M. Freeman Jr. – Charleston County 1874
Florian Henry Frost – Williamsburg County 1870
Reuben Gaither – Kershaw County 1870–1877
Hastings Gantt – Beaufort County 1870–1876, 1878–1884
John Gardner – Edgefield County 1868
William H. Gardner – Sumter County 1870
Stephen Gary – Kershaw County 1870, 1874
Ebenezer F. George – Kershaw County 1874
John Gibson – Fairfield County 1876
Fortune Giles – Williamsburg County 1870–1874
John T. Gilmore – Richland County 1872–1874
William C. Glover – Charleston County 1870
Mitchell Goggins – Abbeville County 1870, 1874
Aesop Goodson – Richland County 1868–1872
David Graham – Edgefield County 1872–1876
John G. Grant – Marlboro County 1868
William A. Grant – Charleston County 1872
W. H. W. Gray – Charleston County 1868
Adam Green – Aiken County
Charles Samuel Green – Georgetown County 1872–1878
John Green – Edgefield County 1872
Samuel Green – Beaufort County 1870–1875 (also South Carolina Senate)
Ishom Greenwood – Newberry County 1872
M. C. Hamilton – Beaufort County 1892–1894
Thomas Hamilton – Beaufort County 1872–1876
James J. Hardy – Charleston County 1870, 1871
R. M. Harriett – Georgetown County 1874
David Harris – Edgefield County 1868–1872
Alfred Hart – Darlington County 1870
Eben Hayes – Marion County 1868, 1872
Charles D. Hayne – Barnwell County 1868 (also South Carolina Senate,  South Carolina Constitutional Convention, Secretary of State, and postmaster)
H. E. Hayne  – Marion County
James N. Hayne – Barnwell County 1868
William A. Hayne – Marion County 1874
Plato P. Hedges – Charleston County 1870
James A. Henderson – Newberry County 1868, 1874
John T. Henderson – Newberry County 1870
Zachariah Hines – Darlington County
Gloster H. Holland – Aiken County 1870–1874 
Abraham P. Holmes – Colleton County 1870–1874
Allison W. Hough – Kershaw County 1872
A. H. Howard – Marion County 1872
W. R. Hoyt – Colleton County 1868
Allen Hudson – Lancaster County 1870, 1874
Richard H. Humbert – Darlington County 1871–1876
Barney Humphries – Chester County 1868–1872
Alfred T. B. Hunter – Laurens County 1874
H. H. Hunter – Charleston County
James Hutson – Newberry County 1868
Austin Jackson – Barnwell County 1874
Henry Jacobs – Fairfield County 1868 (also South Carolina Constitutional Convention)
Burrell James – Sumter County 1868
Paul W. Jefferson – Aiken County 1874
William R. Jervey – Charleston County 1868 (also South Carolina Senate and South Carolina Constitutional Convention)
D. I. J. Johnson – Chesterfield County 1868
Griffin C. Johnson – Laurens County 1868–1872
Henry Johnson – Fairfield County 1868
John W. Johnson – Marion County 1872–1874
Samuel Johnson – Charleston County 1868
William E. Johnston – Sumter County 1868, 1869 (also South Carolina Senate)
A. H. Jones – Charleston County 1874
Marshall Jones – Orangeburg County 1886
Paul E. Jones – Orangeburg County 1874
William H. Jones – Georgetown County 1868–1872 (also South Carolina Senate)
Samuel J. Keith – Darlington County 1870–1876
Willliam Keitt – Newberry County 1876
 P. R. Kinloch – Georgetown County 1876
Jordan Lang – Darlington County 1868–1872 (also South Carolina Constitutional Convention)
J. S. Lazarus – Charleston County 1876 
George H. Lee – Charleston County 1868
John Lee – Chester County 1872
Levi Lee – Fairfield County 1872
Samuel J. Lee – Edgefield and Aiken counties 1868–1874
J. J. Lesesne – Charleston County 1876 
John Lilley – Chester County 1872
Joseph W. Lloyd – Charleston County 1870
Aaron Logan – Charleston County 1870
Huston J. Lomax – Abbeville County 1868
William Lowman – Richland County 1876
William Maree – Colleton County 1876–1880
Thomas Martin – Abbeville County 1872
Julius Mayer – Barnwell County 1868
James P. Mays – Orangeburg County 1868–1872
Harry McDaniels – Laurens County 1868
Thomas D. McDowell – Georgetown County
William McKinlay – Orangeburg and Charleston counties 1868 (also South Carolina Constitutional Congress and city council)
John W. Mead – York County 1868–1872
George M. Mears – Charleston County 1880–1892
S. Melton – Clarendon County 1876
Edward C. Mickey – Charleston County 1868–1872
Benjamin Middleton – Barnwell County 1872
F. F. Miller – Georgetown County 1868
Isaac Miller – Fairfield County 1872
M. Miller – Fairfield County 1872
Thomas E. Miller – Beaufort County 1866, 1874–1880, 1886–1888, 1894–1896 (also U.S. Congress, South Carolina Constitutional Convention, and South Carolina Senate)
James Mills – Laurens County 1872
L. S. Mills – Beaufort County 1882
Syphax Milton – Clarendon County 1870–1872, 1874–1876
Charles S. Minort – Richland County 1872–1874
F. S. Mitchell – Beaufort County 1884
Junius S. Mobley – Union County 1868
Alfred M. Moore – Fairfield County 1870
Shadrack Morgan – Orangeburg County 1874–1876
William C. Morrison – Beaufort County 1876
William J. Moultrie – Georgetown County 1880–1884
Nathaniel B. Myers – Beaufort County 1876
William F. Myers – Colleton County 1870–1875 
Lee Nance – Newberry County
Jonas W. Nash – Kershaw County 1868,1876
? Nehemiah – Beaufort County
William Nelson – Clarendon County 1868
Richard Neabitt – Charleston County 1874
Frederick Nix Jr. – Barnwell County 1872 (also postmaster)
Charles F. North – Charleston County 1872
Samuel Nuckles – Union County 1868–1872 (also South Carolina Continental Congress)
Nathaniel B. Myers – Beaufort County 1870–1875, 1876
Joseph Alexander Owens – Barnwell County 1880
Robert John Palmer – Richland County 1876
Joseph Parker – Charleston County 1880
Jeffrey Prendergrass – Williamsburg County 1868–1872
Wade Perrin – Laurens County 1868, 1871
James F. Peterson – Williamsburg County 1872–1878
Edward Petty – Charleston County 1872
William G. Pinckney – Charleston County 1874–1876; Berkeley County 1882–1884
Thomas Pressley – Williamsburg County 1872
Isaac Prioleau – Charleston County 1872–1874, 1876
M. H. Priolean – Charleston County 
Henry W. Purvis – Lexington County 1868 (also South Carolina Adjunct General)
Warren W. Ramsey – Sumter County 1869–1876
Alonzo J. Ransier – Charleston County 1868 (also South Carolina Lt. Governor, U.S. House, U.S. Constitutional Convention)
Cain Ravenel – Berkeley County 1882
George A. Reed – Beaufort County 1872–1874, 1876
W. H. Reedish – Orangeburg County 1876 
A. C. Reynolds – Beaufort County 1888
J. C. Rice – Beaufort County 1886
James Richardson – Colleton County
Mark P. Richardson – Berkeley County 1890
Thomas Richardson – Colleton County 1868–1870, 1874–1876
Henry Riley – Orangeburg County 1872
J. R. Rivers – Beaufort County 1882
Prince Rivers – Edgefield and Aiken counties 1868–1874 (also South Carolina Constitutional Convention
Joseph Robinson – Beaufort County 1876, 1880–1886
John C. Rue – Beaufort County 1880
Alfred Rush – Darlington County 1868, 1874
Thaddeus Sasportas – Chester County 1868 (also South Carolina Constitutional Convention and postmaster)
Sancho Saunders – Chester County 1868 (also South Carolina Constitutional Convention)
Robert F. Scott – Williamsburg County 1868
William C. Scott – Williamsburg County 1874
W. H. Sheppard – Beaufort County 1884
Henry L. Shrewsbury – Chesterfield County 1868
Augustus Simkins – Edgefield County 1872–1876
Aaron Simmons – Orangeburg County 1874–1876, 1882–1886, 1888–1890
Benjamin Simmons – Beaufort County 1875–1876, 1878–1880
Hercules Simmons – Colleton County 1874
Limus Simons – Edgefield County 1872
William Simons – Richland County 1868–1872, 1874–1876
Paris Simpkins – Edgefield County 1872–1876
Charles Sims – Chester County 1872
Andrew Singleton – Berkeley County 1870
Asbury L. Singleton – Sumter County 1870
J. P. Singleton – Chesterfield County 1870
James Singleton – Berkeley County 1882
B. F. Smalls – Charleston County 1876 
Robert Smalls –  Beaufort County 1868 (also South Carolina Senate, South Carolina Constitutional Convention, U.S. States Congress, and collector of customs)
Sherman Smalls – Colleton County 1870–1874
Rev. W. Smalls – Charleston County 1878
James E. Smiley – Sumter County 1868
Abraham W. Smith – Charleston County 1868, 1876
Jackson A. Smith – Darlington County 1872–1876
Powell Smythe – Clarendon County 1868
Butler Spears – Sumter County 1872
James A. Spencer – Abbeville County 1872
Nathaniel T. Spencer – Charleston County 1872
Charles H. Sperry – Georgetown County 1872
Henry Steele – York County 1874
D. Augustus Straker – Orangeburg County 1876, 1877, 1878 but was denied his seat all three times (also Inspector of Customs)
Caesar Sullivan – Laurens County 1872
Robert Tarlton – Colleton County 1870–1874
John W. Thomas – Marlboro County 1870
W. H. Thomas – Newberry County 1876
William M. Thomas – Colleton County 1868–1876 (also South Carolina Constitutional Convention)
Benjamin A. Thompson – Marion County 1868
Joseph Thompson – Richland County 1874
Samuel B. Thompson – Richland County 1868–1874 (also South Carolina Constitutional Convention)
Julius C. Tingman – Charleston County 1872, 1876
Robert Turner – Charleston County 1870–1876
Richard M. Valentine – Abbeville County 1868
John Vanderpool – Charleston County 1872–1876
Dublin Walker – Chester County 1874–1877
John Wallace – Orangeburg County 1870
Thomas H. Wallace – Berkeley County 1890
Jared D. Warley – Clarendon County 1870–1874 (also South Carolina Senate)
J. J. Washington – Beaufort County 1886–1890
Archie Weldon – Edgefield County 1874
James Wells – Richland County 1876
John W. Westberry – Sumter County 1874, 1878
Ellison M. Weston – Richland County 1874
William James Whipper – Beaufort County 1868–1872, 1875 (also South Carolina Constitutional Convention and probate judge)
John H. White  – York County 1868
Hannibal A. Wideman – Abbeville County 1872–1876
James Wigg – Beaufort County 1890
Charles McDuffie Wilder – Richland County 1868 (also postmaster and South Carolina Constitutional Convention)
Bruce H. Williams – Georgetown County 1874
James Clement Wilson – Sumter County 1872
Zachariah W. Wines – Darlington County 1876
John B. Wright – Charleston and York counties 1868–1872
Smart Wright – Charleston County 1874
James M. Young – Laurens County 1872–1876
Prince Young – Chester County 1872

South Carolina Constitutional Convention

 Purvis Alexander – Chester County 1868
 T.  Andrews – Sumter County
 John Bonum – Edgefield County 1868
 Benjamin A. Boseman Jr. – (South Carolina House and postmaster)
 Isaac Brockenton – Darlington County, 1868 (also South Carolina House)
 Barney Burton – Chester County 1868 (also South Carolina House)
 Benjamin Byas – Berkeley County 1868 (also South Carolina House)
 E. J. Cain – Orangeburg, South Carolina 1868
 Richard H. Cain – Charleston County 1868 (also U.S. Congress, city council, and South Carolina Senate, House, Attorney General, and Constitutional Convention)
 Francis Lewis Cardozo– Charleston County 1868  (also Secretary of State of South Carolina and South Carolina State Treasurer)
 John A. Chestnut – Kershaw County 1868 (also South Carolina House)
 Albert Clinton – Lancaster County 1868
 Samuel P. Coker
 Wilson Cooke – Greenville County 1868 (also South Carolina House)
 Nelson Davis – Laurens County 1868
 Robert C. De Large – Charleston County 1868 (also South Carolina House, U.S. Congress, State Land Commissioner)
 Abram Dogan – Union County 1868
 William Driffle – Colleton County 1868
 H. D. Edwards  – Fairfield County 1868
 Robert B. Elliott – Edgefield County 1868 (also South Carolina House, South Carolina  Attorney General, U.S. Congress, and county commissioner)
 Rice Foster – Spartanburg County 1868
 W. H. W. Gray – Berkeley County 1868
 David Harris – Edgefield County 1868
 C. D. Hayne – Barnwell County 1868
 Harry E. Hayne – Marion County 1868 (South Carolina Senate, South Carolina House, Secretary of State, and postmaster)
 James N. Hayne – Barnwell County 1868
 George Henderson – Newberry County 1868
 Richard Hubert – Darlington County 1868
 Allen Hudson, Lancaster County
 George Jackson – Marlboro County 1868
 Henry Jacobs –  Fairfield County 1868 (also South Carolina House)
 William Jervey – Berkeley County 1868 (also South Carolina House and South Carolina Senate)
 J. W. Johnson – Marion County 1868
 Samuel Johnson – Anderson County 1868
 W. B. Johnson – Greenville County 1868
 W. E. Johnson – Sumter County 1868
 W. M. Joiner – Abbeville County 1868
 Charles Jones – Lancaster County 1868
 Henry Jones – Horry County 1868
 Jordan Lang – Darlington County 1868 (also South Carolina House)
 L. S. Langley –  Beaufort County 1868
 George Lee – Berkeley County 1868
 Samuel Lee – Sumter County 1868
 Aaron Logan
 Huston J. Lomax – Abbeville County 1868 (also South Carolina Senate)
 Julius Mayer – Barnwell County 1868
 Harry McDaniels – Laurens County 1868
 W. J. McKinlay – Orangeburg County 1868
 William McKinlay – Charleston County 1868 (also South Carolina House and city council)
 J. W. Meade – York County 1868
 A. Middleton – Barnwell County 1868
 F. F. Miller – Georgetown County 1868
 Thomas E. Miller – 1895 (also U.S. Congress, South Carolina Senate, and South House)
 Lee Nance  – Newberry County 1868
 William B. Nash – Richland County 1868 (also South Carolina Senate)
 William Nelson – Clarendon County 1868
 Samuel Nuckles – Union County 1868 (also South Carolina House)
 C. M. Olsen – Williamsburg County 1868
 Joseph Rainey –  Georgetown County 1868 (also U.S. Congress and South Carolina Senate)
 Benjamin F. Randolph – Orangeburg County 1868 (also South Carolina Senate)
 Alonzo J. Ransier –  Charleston County 1868 (also South Carolina Lt. Governor, U.S. Congress, South Carolina House)
 L. R. Reed – 1895
 Prince Rivers – Edgefield County 1868 (also South Carolina House)
 Sancho Sanders – Chester County 1868 (also South Carolina House)
 Thaddeous Sasportas – Orangeburg County 1868 (also South Carolina House and postmaster)
 H. L. Shrewsbury – Chesterfield County 1868
 Robert Smalls – Beaufort County 1868, 1895 (also U.S. Congress, South Carolina House, South Carolina Senate, and collector of customs)
 Calvin Stubbs – Marlboro County 1868
 Stephen Atkins Swails – Williamsburg County 1868 (also South Carolina Senate and mayor)
 William M. Thomas – Colleton County 1868 (South Carolina House)
 A. R. Thompson – Horry County 1868 
 B. A. Thompson –  Marion County 1868
 Samuel B. Thompson – Richland County 1865 (also South Carolina House)
 W. M. Viney – Colleton County 1868
 William James Whipper – Beaufort County 1868, 1895 (also South Carolina House and probate judge)
 J. H. White – York County 1868
 James Wigg – 1895
 Charles McDuffie Wilder – Richland County 1868 (also South Carolina House and postmaster)
 F. E. Wilder – Beaufort County 1868
 Thomas Williamson –  Abbeville County 1868
 Coy Wingo –  Spartanburg County 1868
 J. J. Wright –  Beaufort County 1868

Other state offices

 Francis Lewis Cardozo – Secretary of State of South Carolina 1868–1872; South Carolina State Treasurer 1872–1877 (also South Carolina Constitutional Convention)
 R. C. De Large – State Land Commissioner 1870; State Commissioner Sinking Fund (also U.S. Congress, South Carolina House, and South Carolina Constitutional Congress)
 Robert B. Elliott – Attorney General of South Carolina 1876–1877 (also South Carolina House, U.S. Congress, South Carolina Constitutional Convention, South Carolina Senate, and county commissioner)
 J. E. Green – sergeant of arms South Carolina Senate
 Richard Theodore Greener – South Carolina school system commissioner 1875
 Harry E. Hayne – Secretary of State of South Carolina 1872–1878 and State Land Commissioner (South Carolina Senate, South Carolina House, South Carolina Constitutional Convention, and postmaster)
 Styles Hutchins – state judge (also Tennessee House of Representatives)
 Albert Osceola Jones – clerk of South Carolina House of Representatives 1868–1876
 Walter R. Jones – secretary of the State Financial Board (also city council clerk)
 Henry W. Purvis – Adjunct General 1872–1876 (also South Carolina House)
 John Williams – Sergeant at Arms of the South Carolina House of Representatives
 Jonathan Jasper Wright – Associate Justice of South Carolina Supreme Court 1870–1877 (also South Carolina Senate)

Federal offices 

 Robert B. Anderson – postmaster of Georgetown March 16, 1898 – February 28, 1902 (also South Carolina House
 Frazier B. Baker – postmaster of Effingham March 15, 1892 – September 2, 1893; Lake City July 30, 1897 – February 22, 1898
 Samuel Bampfield – postmaster of Beaufort October 5, 1897 – February 2, 1900 (also South Carolina House)
 Robert R. Bethea – postmaster of Latta July 31, 1890 – August 16, 1894
 Benjamin A. Boseman – postmaster of Charleston March 18, 1873 – February 23, 1881 (also South Carolina Constitutional Convention and South Carolina House)
 William E. Boykin – postmaster of Mayesville April 12, 1882 – September 10, 1885
 Israel W. Brown – postmaster of Hardeeville July 20, 1883 – April 4, 1885
 Marion F. Campbell – postmaster of Beaufort February 28, 1891 – April 8, 1893
 Richard J. Cochran – postmaster of Bucksville October 6, 1890 – January 16, 1895
 Joseph S. Collins – postmaster of Eastover February 18, 1898 – October 15, 1900
 Harriet "Hattie" R. Commander – postmaster of Chesterfield June 11, 1889 – December 11, 1893
 John Z. Crook – postmaster of St George May 14, 1883 – January 23, 1890; April 29, 1885 – January 20, 1894
 Eliza H. Davis – postmaster of Summerville July 23, 1873 – September 10, 1884
 James A. Davison – postmaster of Blackville March 20, 1890 – October 2, 1897; September 19, 1893 –April 5, 1906
 Adam C. Dayson – postmaster of Stono June 6, 1892 – February 28, 1895 
 Wesley S. Dixon – postmaster of Barnwell February 23, 1882 – January 11, 1884
 A. H. Durant – postmaster of Marion August 25, 1884 – May 18, 1885
 Julius Durant – postmaster of Paxville July 21, 1897 – November 11, 1908
 Philip E. Ezekiel – postmaster of Beaufort July 17, 1871 – February 26, 1887
 Lawrence Faulkner – postmaster of Society Hill October 17, 1877 – May 17, 1889
 Irving T. Fleming – postmaster of Magnolia (became Lynchburg in 1905) January 26, 1898 – January 12, 1911
 Theodore B. Gordon – postmaster of Conway August 12, 1891 – June 12, 1894
 John D. Graham – postmaster of Sheldon October 15, 1890 – December 20, 1899; April 19, 1898 – December 31, 1905
 Charles Samuel Green – postmaster of Plantersville October 26, 1883 – May 12, 1885 (also South Carolina House)
 Moses W. Harrall – postmaster of Timmonsville March 3, 1884 – July 24, 1889; January 16, 1885 – January 30, 1894
 Charles D. Hayne – postmaster of Aiken March 23, 1869 – January 23, 1871 (South Carolina Constitutional Convention, South Carolina Secretary of State, South Carolina House, and South Carolina Senate)
 James H. Holloway – postmaster of Marion Court House September 9, 1870 – August 25, 1884
 Louisa C. Jones – postmaster of Ridgeland September 30, 1897 – January 7, 1910
 Robert M. Keene – postmaster of Statesburg August 16, 1889 – October 9, 1893
 Moses J. Langley – postmaster of Chopee March 15, 1890 – May 2, 1894
 John Lee – postmaster of Chester April 27, 1875 – November 27, 1876 (also South Carolina Senate)
 Edward D. Littlejohn – postmaster of Gaffney May 7, 1892 – November 4, 1893
 Major D. Macfarlan – postmaster of Cheraw July 9, 1892 –  November 13, 1897; December 9, 1893 – April 23, 1900
 John W. Manigault – postmaster of Providence December 21, 1889 – September 4, 1890
 John C. Mardenborough – postmaster of Port Royal December 31, 1879 – February 1, 1898; August 18, 1885 – February 23, 1905
 Henry J. Maxwell – postmaster of Bennettsville March 16, 1869 – November 16, 1870 (also South Carolina Senate)
 John J. Mays – postmaster of Branchville February 25, 1883 – February 29, 1885
 Benjamin W. Middleton – postmaster of Midway March 24, 1870 – December 16, 1872
 Mary S. Middleton – postmaster of Midway December 16, 1872 – August 30, 1875
 Isaac R. Miller – postmaster of Bishopville February 26, 1890 – July 31, 1890
 J. W. Moody – postmaster of Mullins July 3, 1884 – September 17, 1889; May 4, 1885 – December 26, 1893
 W. J. Moultrie – postmaster of Georgetown July 22, 1884 – August 2, 1886
 William Emory Nichols – postmaster of Nichols July 30, 1890 – August 4, 1891
 Frederick Nix Jr. – postmaster of Blackville August 7, 1879 – May 11, 1885 (also South Carolina House)
 William A. Paul – postmaster of Walterborough February 14, 1884 – May 17, 1889; June 12, 1885 – May 23, 1893
 John T. Rafra – postmaster of Society Hill May 17, 1889 – September 22, 1893
 Edward C. Rainey – postmaster of Georgetown January 11, 1875 – June 7, 1877
 Laura Reed – postmaster of Edisto Island May 30, 1898 – September 21, 1908; March 12, 1901 – January 12, 1910
 John J. Reynolds – postmaster of Verdery May 24, 1889 – November 11, 1890
 Alexander S. Richardson – postmaster of Chester September 22, 1873 – April 27, 1875
 Joseph V. Rivers – postmaster of Lady's Island March 19, 1879 – September 8, 1885
 Thomas Robinson – postmaster of Bamberg December 27, 1883 – April 21, 1885
 Thaddeus Sasportas – postmaster of Orangeburg March 19, 1869 – February 17, 1870 (also South Carolina House and South Carolina Constitutional Convention)
 Edward J. Sawyer – postmaster of Bennettsville August 27, 1883 – May 9, 1892; June 29, 1885 – November 13, 1893
 Daniel Sanders – postmaster of Walterborough March 31, 1873 – February 14, 1884
 Robert Smalls – Collector of Customs at Beaufort 1899–1913 (also U.S. Congress, South Carolina House, South Carolina Senate, and South Carolina Constitutional Convention)
 Ishmael H. Smith – postmaster of Port Royal June 22, 1889 – August 9, 1893
 Frances J. M. Sperry – postmaster of Georgetown September 27, 1890 – June 19, 1893
 Robert H. Stanley – postmaster of Dovesville July 29, 1889 – December 26, 1893
 D. Augustus Straker – Inspector of Customs at the port of Charleston (also South Carolina House).
 Robert A. Stewart – postmaster of Manning May 17, 1889 – December 26, 1893
 William D. Tardif Jr. – postmaster of Foreston March 3, 1884 – May 1885
 Robert S. Tarleton – postmaster of White Hall August 20, 1883 – April 22, 1885
 Henry C. Tindal – postmaster of Paxsville March 12, 1891 – December 26, 1893
 Cohen Whithead or Whitiehead – postmaster of Kingstree July 26, 1877 – October 25, 1886
 Charles McDuffie Wilder – postmaster of Columbia April 5, 1869 – June 2, 1885 (also South Carolina House and South Carolina Constitutional Convention)
 Joshua E. Wilson – postmaster of Florence February 8, 1876 – January 27, 1885; March 24, 1890 – July 18, 1899; April 9, 1883 – March 9, 1886; May 11, 1894 – September 1, 1909
 Zachariah Wines – postmaster of Society Hill October 30, 1897 – November 23, 1904 (also South Carolina House)

Local offices 
 Ennals J. Adams – Charleston City Council 1868
 Macon B. Allen – judge of Charleston County Criminal Court 1873; probate judge for Charleston County 1876 (also a justice of the peace in Massachusetts)
 Harrison N. Bouey – Edgefield County probate judge in 1875
 Malcom Brown – Charleston City Council 1869
 Richard H. Cain – Charleston City Council 1868 (U.S. Congress and South Carolina Attorney General, Senate, House, Constitutional Convention)
 Richard Dereef – Charleston City Council 1868
 Robert B. Elliott – Barnwell County commissioner  (also U.S. Congress, South Carolina Attorney General, South Carolina Constitutional Convention, and South Carolina House)
 W. G. Fields – Charleston City Council 1874
 S. B. Garrett – Charleston City Council 1874
 John A. Godfrey – Charleston City Council 1874
 John Gordon – Charleston City Council 1874
 R. N. Gregorie – Charleston City Council 1874
 William R. Hampton – Charleston City Council 1869
 Richard Holloway – Charleston City Council 1869
 Robert Howard – Charleston City Council 1868, 1869
 Walter R. Jones – Clerk of the City Council of Columbia (also State Financial Board)
 William McKinlay – Charleston City Council 1868, 1869, 1874 (also South Carolina House and South Carolina Constitutional Congress)
 A. B. Mitchell – Charleston City Council 1874
 B. Moncrief – Charleston City Council 1874
 George Shrewsbury – Charleston City Council 1874
 Thomas Small – Charleston City Council 1869
 Stephen Atkins Swails – mayor of Kingstree 1868 (also South Carolina Senate)
 Philip Thorne – Charleston City Council 1869
 James Wagoner – York County trial justice
 Edward P. Wall – Charleston City Council 1868, 1869
 Launcelot F. Wall – Charleston City Council 1869
 William Weston – Charleston City Council 1868
 William James Whipper – judge of probate Beaufort County (also South Carolina House and South Carolina Constitutional Convention)

Tennessee
Only one African American served in the Tennessee Legislature during the 1870s, but more than a dozen followed in the 1880s as Republicans retook the governorship. They advocated for schools for African Americans, spoke against segregated public facilities, and advocated for voting rights protections.

Tennessee House of Representatives 
 John W. Boyd – Tipton County 1881 Weakley County 1883 (also magistrate)
 Thomas F. Cassels – Shelby County 1881
 Greene E. Evans – Shelby County 1885
William A. Feilds – Shelby County 1885 (also justice of the peace)
? Goodman –  Fayette County 1889
Jesse M. H. Graham – Montgomery County, 1895
 William C. Hodge – Hamilton County 1885 (also alderman)
 Leon Howard – Shelby County 1883
 Styles Hutchins – Hamilton County 1887–1888 (also state judge in South Carolina)
 Sampson W. Keeble – Davidson County 1871 (also magistrate)
 Samuel A. McElwee – Haywood County 1879–1883
 Isham F. Norris – Shelby County 1881
 David F. Rivers – Fayette County 1883, was reelected for the 1885 term but forced to leave the county
 Thomas A. Sykes – Davidson County 1877, 1881 (also North Carolina House)

Other state offices 
 James H. Sumner – door-keeper of the Tennessee House of Representatives 1867–1869

Other state and federal offices 
 James Carroll Napier – State Department Clerk (also Nashville Board of Aldermen)

Local offices 

 John W. Boyd – magistrate in Tipton County 1876–1882, 1885 ?–1906 (also Tennessee House)
 Randall Brown – Davidson County commissioner
 William A. Feilds – Shelby County  justice of the peace (also Tennessee House)
 Charles Gowdey – Nashville Board of Aldermen
 William C. Hodge – 4th Ward of Chattanooga alderman 1878–1887 (also Tennessee House)
 Sampson W. Keeble – Davidson County magistrate 1877–1882 (also Tennessee House)
 James Carroll Napier – Nashville Board of Aldermen (also State Department Clerk)
 William Bennett Scott Sr. – mayor of Maryville 1869
 Josiah T. Settle – Assistant Attorney General for Shelby County 1885–1887 (also Mississippi House)

Texas
During the Reconstruction era, four African Americans won election to the Texas Senate and 32 to the Texas House of Representatives.

Texas Senate 
Walter Moses Burton – Austin, Fort Bend, and Wharton counties 1874–1876; Fort Bend, Waller, and Wharton counties 1876–1883
Matthew Gaines – District 16/Lee County 1870–1873
Walter E. Riptoe – Harrison County 1876–1881
George Ruby – Brazoria, Galveston, and Matagorda counties 1870–1871, 1873 (also Texas Constitutional Convention)

Texas House of Representatives
David Abner Sr. – Harrison and Rusk counties 1874 (also Texas Constitutional Convention)
Richard Allen – Harris and Montgomery counties 1870, 1873
Edward Anderson – Harris and Montgomery counties 1873
Alexander Asberry – Robertson County 1889
Houston A. P. Bassett – Grimes County 1887
Thomas Beck – Grimes County 1874, 1879
D. W. Burley – Robertson, Leon, and Freestone counties 1870
Silas Cotton – Robertson, Leon, and Freestone counties 1870
Goldsteen Dupree – Montgomery and Harris counties 1870
Robert J. Evans – Grimes County 1879–1883
Jacob E. Freeman – Waller, Fort Bend, and Wharton counties 1874, 1880
Harriel G. Geiger – Robertson County 1879, 1881
Bedford G. Guy – Washington County 1879 
Nathan H. Haller – Brazoria County 1892–1897
Jeremiah J. Hamilton –  Fayette and Bastrop counties 1870
William H. Holland – Waller, Fort Bend, and Wharton counties 1876
Mitchell Kendall – Harrison County 1870 (also Texas Constitutional Convention)
Robert A. Kerr – Bastrop County 1881
Doc C. Lewis – Wharton County 1881
Elias Mayes – Brazos County 1879, 1889
David Medlock – Limestone, Falls, and McLennan counties 1870
John Mitchell – Burleson, Brazos, and Milam counties 1870; Burleson and Washington counties 1873 (also Texas Constitutional Convention)
E. C. Mobley – Robertson County 1882
Henry Moore – Harrison County 1870, 1873
Robert J. Moore – Washington County 1883–1889
Sheppard Mullens – McLennan County 1870 
Edward Patton – San Jacinto and Polk counties 1891
Henry Phelps – Wharton, Austin, and Fort Bend counties 1872
Meshack R. Roberts – Fifth District/Rusk and Harrison counties 1873, 1875; Tenth District/Harrison County 1877
Alonzo Sledge – Washington and Burleson counties 1879
Robert Lloyd Smith – Colorado County 1895–1899
Henry Sneed – Waller, Wharton, and Fort Bend counties 1877
James H. Stewart – 48th District/Robertson County 1885
James H. Washington – Grimes County 1873
Allen W. Wilder – Washington County 1873
Benjamin Franklin Williams – 25th District/Lavaca and Colorado counties 1871; 37th District/Waller, Fort Bend, and Wharton counties 1879; 53rd District/Waller and Fort Bend counties 1885 (also Texas Constitutional Convention) 
Richard Williams – Walker, Grimes, and Madison counties 1870, 1873
George W. Wyatt – Waller and Fort Bend counties 1883

Texas Constitutional Convention 

 David Abner Sr. – District 5/Harrison and Rusk counties 1875 (also Texas House)
 Charles W. Bryant – Harris County 1868–1869
 Stephen Curtis – Brazos County 1868–1869
 Bird Davis – Wharton County 1875
 Melvin Goddin – 15th District 1875
 Wiley Johnson – Harrison County 1868–1869
 Mitchell Kendall – Harrison County 1868–1869 (also Texas House)
 Ralph Long – Limestone, Navarro, and Hill counties 1868–1869
 Lloyd Henry McCabe – Fort Bend County 1875
 James McWashington – Montgomery County 1868–1869
 John Mitchell – Burleson and Washington counties 1875 (also Texas House)
 Sheppard Mullens – McLennan County 1868 (also Texas House)
 William Reynolds – Waller County 1875
 George Ruby – Brazoria, Galveston, and Matagorda counties 1896–1969 (also Texas Senate)
 Benjamin O. Watrous – Washington County 1868–1869
 Benjamin Franklin Williams – 1868–1869 (also Texas House)

Federal offices 

 Norris Wright Cuney – United States Collector of Customs Port of Galveston 1889 (Board of Aldermen)
 Jasper N. Hamilton – postmaster of Eylau April 10, 1890 – June 11, 1895

Local offices 

 Norris Wright Cuney – 12th district member of the Galveston Board of Aldermen 1883 (also U.S. Customs Collector)

Virginia
In 2012, the Virginia Senate enacted Joint Resolution No. 89, recognizing that Reconstruction in Virginia lasted from 1869 to 1890 due to Jim Crow laws; federal Reconstruction ended in 1877.

Senate of Virginia 
 James W. D. Bland – Prince Edward County 1869 (also Virginia Constitutional Convention)
 Cephas L. Davis – Mecklenburg County 1879
 John M. Dawson – Charles City, Elizabeth City, James City, Warwick, and York counties 1874–1877
 Joseph P. Evans – Petersburg County 1874
 Nathaniel M. Griggs – Prince Edward County 1887–1890
 James R. Jones Mecklenburg County – 1875–1877 and 1881–1883
 Isaiah L. Lyons – Surry, York, Elizabeth City, and Warwick counties 1869–1871
 William P. Moseley – Goochland County 1869–1871 (also Virginia Constitutional Convention)
 Francis "Frank" Moss – Buckingham County 1869–1871 (also Virginia House and Virginia Constitutional Convention)
 Daniel M. Norton – James City and York counties 1871–1873 and 1877–1887 (also Virginia Constitutional Convention)
 Guy Powell – Nottoway, Lunenburg and Brunswick counties 1875–1878
 John Robinson – Cumberland County 1869–1873 (also Virginia Constitutional Convention)
 William N. Stevens – Petersburg County 1871–1878 and Sussex County 1881 (also Virginia House)
 George Teamoh – Norfolk County 1869–1871 (also Virginia Constitutional Convention)

Virginia House of Delegates 
 William H. Andrews – Surry County 1869–1871 (also Virginia  Constitutional Convention)
 William H. Ash – Amelia and Nottoway counties 1887
 Briton Baskerville, Jr. – Mecklenburg County 1887
 Edward David Bland – Prince George and Surry counties 1879–1884
 Phillip S. Bolling – Cumberland and Buckingham counties; elected in 1883 but was ruled ineligible
 Samuel P. Bolling – Cumberland and Buckingham counties 1883–1887
 Tazewell Branch – Prince Edward County 1874–1877
 William H. Brisby – New Kent County 1869–1871
 Goodman Brown – Prince George and Surry counties 1887
 Peter J. Carter – Northampton County 1871–1878
 Matt Clark – Halifax County 1874
 George William Cole – Essex County 1879
 Asa Coleman – Halifax County 1871–1873
 Johnson Collins – Brunswick County 1879
 Aaron Commodore – Essex County 1875–1877
 Miles Connor – Norfolk County 1875–1877
 Henry Cox – Chesterfield and Powhatan counties 1869–1877
 Isaac Dabbs – Charlotte County 1875–1877
 McDowell Delaney – Amelia County 1871–1873
 Amos Andre Dodson – Mecklenburg County 1883
 Shed Dungee – Cumberland and Buckingham counties 1879–1882
 Jesse Dungey – King William County 1871–1873
 Isaac Edmundson – Halifax County 1869–1871
 Ballard T. Edwards – Chesterfield and Powhatan counties 1869–1871
 Joseph P. Evans – Petersburg County 1871–1873 (also Virginia Senate)
 William D. Evans – Prince Edward County 1877–1880
 William W. Evans – Petersburg County 1887
 William Faulcon – Prince George and Surry counties 1885–1887
 George Fayerman – Petersburg County 1869–1871
 James A. Fields – Elizabeth City and James City counties 1889
 Alexander Q. Franklin – Charles City County 1889
 John Freeman – Halifax County 1871
 William Gilliam – Prince George County 1871–1875
 James P. Goodwyn – Petersburg County 1874
 Armistead Green – Petersburg County 1881–1884
 Robert G. Griffin – James City and York counties 1883
 Nathaniel M. Griggs – Prince Edward County 1883 (also Virginia Senate)
 Ross Hamilton – Mecklenburg County 1869–1882, 1889
 Alfred W. Harris – Petersburg County 1881–1888
 H. Clay Harris – Halifax County 1874–1875
 Henry C. Hill – Amelia County 1874–1875
 Charles E. Hodges – Norfolk County 1869–1871
 John Q. Hodges – Princess Anne County 1869–1871
 Henry Johnson – Amelia and Nottoway counties 1889–1890
 Benjamin Jones – Charles City County 1869–1871
 James R. Jones – Mecklenburg County 1885–1887 (also Virginia Senate)
 Peter K. Jones – Greensville County 1869–1877 (also Virginia Constitutional Convention)
 Robert G. W. Jones – Charles City County 1869–1871
 Rufus S. Jones – Elizabeth City and Warwick counties 1871–1875
 William H. Jordan – Petersburg County 1885–1887
 Alexander G. Lee – Elizabeth City and Warwick 1877–1879
 Neverson Lewis – Chesterfield and Powhatan counties 1879–1882
 James F. Lipscomb – Cumberland County 1869–1877
 William P. Lucas – Louisa County 1874–1875
 John W. B. Matthews – Petersburg County 1871–1873
 J. B. Miller Jr. – Goochland County 1869–1871
 Peter G. Morgan – Petersburg County 1869–1871 (also Virginia Constitutional Convention and city council)
 Francis "Frank" Moss – Buckingham County 1874 (also Virginia Senate and Virginia Constitutional Convention)
 Armistead S. Nickens – Lancaster County 1871–1875
 Frederick S. Norton – James City and Williamsburg counties 1869–1871
 Robert Norton – Elizabeth City and York counties 1869–1872, 1881
 Alexander Owen – Halifax County 1869–1871
 Littleton Owens – Princess Anne County 1879–1882
 Richard G. L. Paige – Norfolk County 1871–1875, 1879–1882
 William H. Patterson – Charles City County 1871–1873
 Caesar Perkins – Buckingham County 1869–1871, 1878–1888, 1887
 Fountain M. Perkins – Louisa County 1869–1871
 John W. Poindexter – Louisa County 1875–1877
 Joseph B. Pope – Southampton County 1879
 Guy Powell – Brunswick County 1881 (also Virginia Senate)
 William H. Ragsdale – Charlotte County 1869–1871
 John H. Robinson – Elizabeth City and James City, and York counties 1887
 R. D. Ruffin – Dinwiddie County 1875
 Archer Scott – Amelia and Nottoway counties 1875–1877, 1879–1884
 George L. Seaton – Alexandria County 1869–1871 
 Dabney Smith – Charlotte County 1881
 Henry D. Smith – Greensville County 18790
 Robert M. Smith – Elizabeth City and Warwick counties 1875–1877
 William N. Stevens – Sussex County 1869–1879 (also Virginia Senate)
 John B. Syphax – Arlington County 1874
 Henry Turpin – Goochland County 1871
 John Watson – Mecklenburg County 1869 (also Virginia Constitutional Convention)
 Maclin C. Wheeler – Brunswick County 1883
 Robert H. Whittaker – Brunswick County 1875–1877
 Ellis Wilson – Dinwiddie County 1869–1871

Virginia Constitutional Convention 
 William H. Andrews – Surry County 1867–1868 (also Virginia House)
 James D. Barrett – Fluvanna County 1867–1868
 Thomas Bayne – Norfolk 1867–1868
 James W. D. Bland – Prince Edward County 1867–1868 (also Virginia Senate)
 William Breedlove – Essex County 1867–1868
 John Brown – Southampton County 1867–1868
 David Canada – Halifax County 1867–1868
 James B. Carter – Chesterfield and Powhatan counties 1867–1868
 Joseph Cox – Richmond 1867–1868
 John Wesley Cromwell – Clerk of the Virginia Constitutional Convention 1867
 Willis Augustus Hodges – Princess Anne County 1867–1868
 Joseph R. Holmes – Charlotte and Halifax counties 1867–1868
 Peter K. Jones – Greensville and Sussex counties 1867–1868 (also Virginia House)
 Samuel F. Kelso – Campbell County 1867–1868
 Lewis Lindsey – Richmond 1867–1868
 Peter G. Morgan – Petersburg 1867–1868 (also Virginia House and city council)
 William P. Moseley – Goochland County 1867–1868 (also Virginia Senate)
 Francis "Frank" Moss – Buckingham County 1867–1868 (also Virginia House and Virginia Senate)
 Edward Nelson – Charlotte County 1867–1868
 Daniel M. Norton – Yorktown 1867–1868 (also Virginia Senate)
 John Robinson – Cumberland County 1867–1868 (also Virginia Senate)
 James T. S. Taylor – Albemarle County 1867–1868
 George Teamoh – Portsmouth 1867–1868 (also Virginia Senate)
 Burwell Toler – Hanover County 1867–1868
 John Watson – Mecklenburg County 1867–1868 (also Virginia House)

Federal offices 

 P. H. A. Braxton – collector at the United States Custom House in Westmoreland County (also constable)
 William Breedlow or Breedlove – postmaster of Tappahannock March 3, 1870 – March 13, 1871
 Robert H. Cauthorn – postmaster of Dunnsville September 21, 1897 – October 24, 1901
 James H. Cunningham – postmaster of Manchester September 20, 1869 – August 1, 1872
 William Henry Hayes – postmaster of Boydton June 17, 1889 – March 25, 1893
 John T. Jackson Sr. – postmaster of Alanthus March 23, 1891 – January 31, 1940
 William H. Johnson – postmaster of Baynesville November 29, 1893 – October 23, 1897
 Wade H. Mason – postmaster of Bluestone March 13, 1890 – November 14, 1902
 Isaac Morton – postmaster of Port Royal March 2, 1870 – October 29, 1872
 Daniel A. Twyman – postmaster of Junta August 12, 1898 – October 23, 1898

Local offices 
 P. H. A. Braxton – King William County constable 1872 (also U.S. Custom House collector)
 Peter G. Morgan – Petersburg city council (also Virginia House and Virginia Constitutional Convention)
 V. Cook Nickens – constable of Leesburg Magisterial District 1873

Washington
Washington did not have any African American legislators during Reconstruction.

Washington House of Representatives 
William Owen Bush – 1889–1895

West Virginia
West Virginia did not have any African American legislators during the Reconstruction.

West Virginia House of Delegates 
Christopher Payne – Fayette County 1896 (also Consul General to the Danish West Indies 1903)

Wyoming
Wyoming did not have any African American legislators during Reconstruction.

Wyoming Territorial House of Representatives 
William Jefferson Hardin – Laramie County 1879–1883

Washington, D.C.

Federal offices 
 Ebenezer Bassett –  1869–1877
 Francis Lewis Cardozo – U.S Postal Service auditor for the United Nates Department of Treasury 1878–1888 (also South Carolina Secretary of State, South Carolina Treasurer, and South Carolina Constitutional Convention)
 John Mercer Langston – U.S. Minister to Haiti 1877–1885 (also U.S. Congress)
 William E. Matthews – clerk in the United States Postal Service 1870–1881
 James Carroll Napier – State Department Clerk (also Nashville Board of Aldermen)

House of Delegates 

 Solomon G. Brown – 1871–1874
 Josiah T. Settle – reading clerk of the House of Delegates 1872 (also Mississippi House)

Local offices 

 Anthony Bowen – Ward 7 Common Council 1879
 John F. Cook – Ward 1 Board of Aldermen 1868 and city registrar 1869
 Walker A. Freeman – Ward 1 Common Council 1870
 Frank B. Gaines – Ward 6 Common Council 1869, 1870
 Thomas A. Grant – Ward 5 Common Council 1870
 John T. Johnson – Ward 3 Common Council 1869; reading clerk for Common Council
 Benjamin McCoy – Ward 4 Common Council 187 
 Sampson Netter – Ward 7 Common Council 1869
 Henry H. Piper – Ward 2 Common Council 1869, 1870
 George W. Ratton – Ward 4 Common Council 1869, 1870
 Carter A. Stewart – Ward 1 Common Council 1868 and Ward 1 Board of Aldermen 1869
 Robert Thompson – Ward 1 Common Council 1869, 1870
 Andrew B. Tinney – Ward 5 Common Council 1869
 James Monroe Trotter – Recorder of Deeds in Washington, D.C. 1887–1890

See also

List of African-American officeholders (1900–1959)
List of African–American Republicans
 List of African American firsts
 List of first African-American mayors
 List of African-American statewide elected officials

Notes

References

Further reading
 Bailey, Richard. Neither Carpetbaggers Nor Scalawags: Black Officeholders During the Reconstruction of Alabama, 1867–1878. Montgomery: Richard Bailey Publishers, 1995. 
 Brown, Jr., Canter. Florida's Black Public Officials, 1867–1924. Tuscaloosa: University of Alabama Press, 1998. 
 Gibbs, Mifflin Wistar. Shadow and Light: An Autobiography. Lincoln: University of Nebraska Press, 1995. 
 Southern Black Leaders of the Reconstruction Era. Howard N. Rabinowitz, editor. University of Illinois Press, 1982. 

Reconstruction Era
 
Officeholders During Reconstruction
History of civil rights in the United States